= Acachmena =

Acachmena may refer to:

- Acachmena (butterfly), a genus of butterflies in the family Nolidae
- Acachmena, a genus of insects in the family Uraniidae, synonym of Cathetus
- Acachmena, a genus of plants in the family Brassicaceae, synonym of Erysimum
