= Group of rational points on the unit circle =

Complex numbers with unit norm and both real and imaginary parts rational numbers

The Pythagorean triple (4,3,5) is associated to the rational point (4/5,3/5) on the unit circle.

In mathematics, the rational points on the unit circle are those points (x, y) such that both x and y are rational numbers ("fractions") and satisfy x^{2} + y^{2} = 1. The set of such points turns out to be closely related to primitive Pythagorean triples. Consider a primitive right triangle, that is, with integer side lengths a, b, c, with c the hypotenuse, such that the sides have no common factor larger than 1. Then on the unit circle there exists the rational point (a/c, b/c), which, in the complex plane, is just a/c + ib/c, where i is the imaginary unit. Conversely, if (x, y) is a rational point on the unit circle in the 1st quadrant of the coordinate system (i.e. x > 0, y > 0), then there exists a primitive right triangle with sides xc, yc, c, with c being the least common multiple of the denominators of x and y. There is a correspondence between points (a, b) in the x-y plane and points a + ib in the complex plane which is used below.

== Group operation ==
The set of rational points on the unit circle, shortened G in this article, forms an infinite abelian group under rotations. The identity element is the point (1, 0) = 1 + i0 = 1. The group operation, or "product" is (x, y) * (t, u) = (xt − uy, xu + yt). This product is angle addition since x = cos(A) and y = sin(A), where A is the angle that the vector (x, y) makes with the vector (1,0), measured counter-clockwise. So with (x, y) and (t, u) forming angles A and B with (1, 0) respectively, their product (xt − uy, xu + yt) is just the rational point on the unit circle forming the angle A + B with (1, 0). The group operation is expressed more easily with complex numbers: identifying the points (x, y) and (t, u) with x + iy and t + iu respectively, the group product above is just the ordinary complex number multiplication (x + iy)(t + iu) = xt − yu + i(xu + yt), which corresponds to the point (xt − uy, xu + yt) as above.

=== Example ===
3/5 + 4/5i and 5/13 + 12/13i (which correspond to the two most famous Pythagorean triples (3,4,5) and (5,12,13)) are rational points on the unit circle in the complex plane, and thus are elements of G. Their group product is −33/65 + 56/65i, which corresponds to the Pythagorean triple (33,56,65). The sum of the squares of the numerators 33 and 56 is 1089 + 3136 = 4225, which is the square of the denominator 65.

=== Other ways to describe the group ===
$$G \cong \mathrm{SO}(2, \mathbb{Q}).$$

The set of all 2×2 rotation matrices with rational entries coincides with G. This follows from the fact that the circle group $S^1$ is isomorphic to $\mathrm{SO}(2, \mathbb{R})$, and the fact that their rational points coincide.

== Group structure ==
The structure of G is an infinite sum of cyclic groups. Let G_{2} denote the subgroup of G generated by the point 0 + 1i. G_{2} is a cyclic subgroup of order 4. For a prime p of form 4k + 1, let G_{p} denote the subgroup of elements with denominator p^{n} where n is a non-negative integer. G_{p} is an infinite cyclic group, and the point (a^{2} − b^{2})/p + (2ab/p)i is a generator of G_{p}. Furthermore, by factoring the denominators of an element of G, it can be shown that G is a direct sum of G_{2} and the G_{p}. That is:

$$G \cong G_2 \oplus \bigoplus_{p \, \equiv \, 1 \, (\text{mod } 4)} G_p.$$

Since it is a direct sum rather than direct product, only finitely many of the values in the G_{p}s are non-zero.

=== Example ===
Viewing G as an infinite direct sum, consider the element ({0}; 2, 0, 1, 0, 0, ..., 0, ...) where the first coordinate 0 is in C_{4} and the other coordinates give the powers of (a^{2} − b^{2})/p(r) + i2ab/p(r), where p(r) is the rth prime number of form 4k + 1. Then this corresponds to, in G, the rational point (3/5 + i4/5)^{2} ⋅ (8/17 + i15/17)^{1} = −416/425 + i87/425. The denominator 425 is the product of the denominator 5 twice, and the denominator 17 once, and as in the previous example, the square of the numerator −416 plus the square of the numerator 87 is equal to the square of the denominator 425. It should also be noted, as a connection to help retain understanding, that the denominator 5 = p(1) is the 1st prime of form 4k + 1, and the denominator 17 = p(3) is the 3rd prime of form 4k + 1.

== The unit hyperbola's group of rational points ==
There is a close connection between this group on the unit hyperbola and the group discussed above. If $\frac {a + ib}{c}$ is a rational point on the unit circle, where a/c and b/c are reduced fractions, then (c/a, b/a) is a rational point on the unit hyperbola, since $(c/a)^2-(b/a)^2=1,$ satisfying the equation for the unit hyperbola. The group operation here is $(x, y) \times (u, v)=(xu+yv, xv+yu),$and the group identity is the same point (1, 0) as above. In this group there is a close connection with the hyperbolic cosine and hyperbolic sine, which parallels the connection with cosine and sine in the unit circle group above.

=== Copies inside a larger group ===
There are isomorphic copies of both groups, as subgroups (and as geometric objects) of the group of the rational points on the abelian variety in four-dimensional space given by the equation $w^2+x^2-y^2+z^2=0.$ Note that this variety is the set of points with Minkowski metric relative to the origin equal to 0. The identity in this larger group is (1, 0, 1, 0), and the group operation is $(a, b, c, d) \times (w, x, y, z)=(aw-bx,ax+bw,cy+dz,cz+dy).$

For the group on the unit circle, the appropriate subgroup is the subgroup of points of the form (w, x, 1, 0), with $w^2+x^2=1,$ and its identity element is (1, 0, 1, 0). The unit hyperbola group corresponds to points of form (1, 0, y, z), with $y^2-z^2=1,$ and the identity is again (1, 0, 1, 0). (Of course, since they are subgroups of the larger group, they both must have the same identity element.)

== See also ==
- Circle group
