= Tangent half-angle formula =

Relates the tangent of half of an angle to trigonometric functions of the entire angle

In trigonometry, tangent half-angle formulas relate the tangent of half of an angle to trigonometric functions of the entire angle.

== Formulae ==
The tangent of half an angle is the stereographic projection of the circle through the point at angle $\pi$ radians onto the line through the angles $\pm \frac{\pi}{2}$. Tangent half-angle formulae include
$$\begin{align}
\tan \tfrac12( \eta \pm \theta)
&= \frac{\tan \tfrac12 \eta \pm \tan \tfrac12 \theta}{1 \mp \tan \tfrac12 \eta \, \tan \tfrac12 \theta}
= \frac{\sin\eta \pm \sin\theta}{\cos\eta + \cos\theta}
= -\frac{\cos\eta - \cos\theta}{\sin\eta \mp \sin\theta}\,,
\end{align}$$
with simpler formulae when η is known to be 0, π/2, π, or 3π/2 because sin(η) and cos(η) can be replaced by simple constants.

In the reverse direction, the formulae include
$$\begin{align}
\sin \alpha & = \frac{2\tan \tfrac12 \alpha}{1 + \tan ^2 \tfrac12 \alpha} \\[7pt]
\cos \alpha & = \frac{1 - \tan ^2 \tfrac12 \alpha}{1 + \tan ^2 \tfrac12 \alpha} \\[7pt]
\tan \alpha & = \frac{2\tan \tfrac12 \alpha}{1 - \tan ^2 \tfrac12 \alpha}\,.
\end{align}$$

== Proofs ==
=== Algebraic proofs ===
Using the angle addition and subtraction formulae for both the sine and cosine one obtains
$$\begin{align}
\sin (a+b) + \sin (a-b) &= 2 \sin a \cos b \\[15mu]
\cos (a+b) + \cos (a-b) & = 2 \cos a \cos b\,.
\end{align}$$

Setting $a= \tfrac12 (\eta+\theta)$ and $b= \tfrac12 (\eta-\theta)$ and substituting yields
$$\begin{align}
\sin \eta + \sin \theta &= 2 \sin \tfrac12(\eta+\theta) \, \cos \tfrac12(\eta-\theta) \\[15mu]
\cos \eta + \cos \theta &= 2 \cos\tfrac12(\eta+\theta) \, \cos\tfrac12(\eta-\theta)\,.
\end{align}$$

Dividing the sum of sines by the sum of cosines gives
$$\frac{\sin \eta + \sin \theta}{\cos \eta + \cos \theta} = \tan \tfrac12(\eta+\theta)\,.$$

Also, a similar calculation starting with $\sin (a+b) - \sin (a-b)$ and $\cos (a+b) - \cos (a-b)$ gives
$$-\frac{\cos \eta - \cos \theta}{\sin \eta - \sin \theta} = \tan \tfrac12(\eta+\theta)\,.$$

Furthermore, using double-angle formulae and the Pythagorean identity $1 + \tan^2 \tfrac12 \alpha = 1 \big/ \cos^2 \tfrac12 \alpha$ gives
$$\sin \alpha
= 2\sin \tfrac12 \alpha \cos \tfrac12 \alpha
= \frac{ 2 \sin \tfrac12 \alpha\, \cos \tfrac12 \alpha
\Big/ \cos^2 \tfrac12 \alpha}
{1 + \tan^2 \tfrac12 \alpha}
= \frac{2\tan \tfrac12 \alpha}{1 + \tan^2 \tfrac12 \alpha}$$
$$\cos \alpha
= \cos^2 \tfrac12 \alpha - \sin^2 \tfrac12 \alpha
= \frac{ \left(\cos^2 \tfrac12 \alpha - \sin^2 \tfrac12 \alpha\right)
\Big/ \cos^2 \tfrac1 2 \alpha}
{  1 + \tan^2 \tfrac12 \alpha}
= \frac{1 - \tan^2 \tfrac12 \alpha}{1 + \tan^2 \tfrac12 \alpha}\,.$$
Taking the quotient of the formulae for sine and cosine yields
$$\tan \alpha = \frac{2\tan \tfrac12 \alpha}{1 - \tan ^2 \tfrac12 \alpha}\,.$$

=== Geometric proofs ===
The sides of this rhombus have length 1. The angle between the horizontal line and the shown diagonal is 1/2 (a + b). This is a geometric way to prove the particular tangent half-angle formula that says tan 1/2 (a + b) = (sin a + sin b) / (cos a + cos b). The formulae sin 1/2(a + b) and cos 1/2(a + b) are the ratios of the actual distances to the length of the diagonal.

Applying the formulae derived above to the rhombus figure on the right, it is readily shown that
$$\tan \tfrac12 (a+b) = \frac{\sin \tfrac12 (a + b)}{\cos \tfrac12 (a + b)} = \frac{\sin a + \sin b}{\cos a + \cos b}.$$

In the unit circle, application of the above shows that $t = \tan \tfrac12 \varphi$. By similarity of triangles,
$$\frac{t}{\sin \varphi} = \frac{1}{1+ \cos \varphi}.$$

It follows that
$$t = \frac{\sin \varphi}{1+ \cos \varphi} = \frac{\sin \varphi(1- \cos \varphi)}{(1+ \cos \varphi)(1- \cos \varphi)} = \frac{1- \cos \varphi}{\sin \varphi}.$$

== The tangent half-angle substitution in integral calculus ==
A geometric proof of the tangent half-angle substitution

In various applications of trigonometry, it is useful to rewrite the trigonometric functions (such as sine and cosine) in terms of rational functions of a new variable $t$. These identities are known collectively as the tangent half-angle formulae because of the definition of $t$. These identities can be useful in calculus for converting rational functions in sine and cosine to functions of t in order to find their antiderivatives.

Geometrically, the construction goes like this: for any point (cos φ, sin φ) on the unit circle, draw the line passing through it and the point (−1, 0). This point crosses the y-axis at some point y = t. One can show using simple geometry that t = tan(φ/2). The equation for the drawn line is y = (1 + x)t. The equation for the intersection of the line and circle is then a quadratic equation involving t. The two solutions to this equation are (−1, 0) and (cos φ, sin φ). This allows us to write the latter as rational functions of t (solutions are given below).

The parameter t represents the stereographic projection of the point (cos φ, sin φ) onto the y-axis with the center of projection at (−1, 0). Thus, the tangent half-angle formulae give conversions between the stereographic coordinate t on the unit circle and the standard angular coordinate φ.

Then we have
$$\begin{align}
& \sin\varphi = \frac{2t}{1 + t^2},
& & \cos\varphi = \frac{1 - t^2}{1 + t^2}, \\[8pt]
& \tan\varphi = \frac{2t}{1 - t^2}
& & \cot\varphi = \frac{1 - t^2}{2t}, \\[8pt]
& \sec\varphi = \frac{1 + t^2}{1 - t^2},
& & \csc\varphi = \frac{1 + t^2}{2t},
\end{align}$$
and
$$e^{i \varphi} = \frac{1 + i t}{1 - i t}, \qquad
e^{-i \varphi} = \frac{1 - i t}{1 + i t}.$$

Both this expression of $e^{i\varphi}$ and the expression $t = \tan(\varphi/2)$ can be solved for $\varphi$. Equating these gives the arctangent in terms of the natural logarithm
$$\arctan t = \frac{-i}{2} \ln\frac{1+it}{1-it}.$$

In calculus, the tangent half-angle substitution is used to find antiderivatives of rational functions of sin φ and cos φ. Differentiating $t=\tan\tfrac12\varphi$ gives
$$\frac{dt}{d\varphi} = \tfrac12\sec^2 \tfrac12\varphi = \tfrac12(1+\tan^2 \tfrac12\varphi) = \tfrac12(1+t^2)$$
and thus
$$d\varphi = {{2\,dt} \over {1 + t^2}}.$$

=== Hyperbolic identities ===
One can play an entirely analogous game with the hyperbolic functions. A point on (the right branch of) a hyperbola is given by (cosh ψ, sinh ψ). Projecting this onto y-axis from the center (−1, 0) gives the following:
$$t = \tanh\tfrac12\psi = \frac{\sinh\psi}{\cosh\psi+1} = \frac{\cosh\psi-1}{\sinh\psi}$$
with the identities
$$\begin{align}
& \sinh\psi = \frac{2t}{1 - t^2},
& & \cosh\psi = \frac{1 + t^2}{1 - t^2}, \\[8pt]
& \tanh\psi = \frac{2t}{1 + t^2},
& & \coth\psi = \frac{1 + t^2}{2t}, \\[8pt]
& \operatorname{sech}\,\psi = \frac{1 - t^2}{1 + t^2},
& & \operatorname{csch}\,\psi = \frac{1 - t^2}{2t},
\end{align}$$
and
$$e^\psi = \frac{1 + t}{1 - t}, \qquad
e^{-\psi} = \frac{1 - t}{1 + t}.$$

Finding ψ in terms of t leads to following relationship between the inverse hyperbolic tangent $\operatorname{artanh}$ and the natural logarithm:
$$2 \operatorname{artanh} t = \ln\frac{1+t}{1-t}.$$

The hyperbolic tangent half-angle substitution in calculus uses
$$d\psi = {{2\,dt} \over {1 - t^2}}\,.$$

== The Gudermannian function ==
Comparing the hyperbolic identities to the circular ones, one notices that they involve the same functions of t, just permuted. If we identify the parameter t in both cases we arrive at a relationship between the circular functions and the hyperbolic ones. That is, if
$$t = \tan\tfrac12 \varphi = \tanh\tfrac12 \psi$$
then
$$\varphi = 2\arctan \bigl(\tanh \tfrac12 \psi\,\bigr) \equiv \operatorname{gd} \psi,$$
where gd(ψ) is the Gudermannian function. The Gudermannian function gives a direct relationship between the circular functions and the hyperbolic ones that does not involve complex numbers. The above descriptions of the tangent half-angle formulae (projection the unit circle and standard hyperbola onto the y-axis) give a geometric interpretation of this function.

== Rational values and Pythagorean triples ==
Starting with a Pythagorean triangle with side lengths a, b, and c that are positive integers and satisfy a^{2} + b^{2} = c^{2}, it follows immediately that each interior angle of the triangle has rational values for sine and cosine, because these are just ratios of side lengths. Thus each of these angles has a rational value for its half-angle tangent, using tan φ/2 = sin φ / (1 + cos φ).

The reverse is also true. If there are two positive angles that sum to 90°, each with a rational half-angle tangent, and the third angle is a right angle then a triangle with these interior angles can be scaled to a Pythagorean triangle. If the third angle is not required to be a right angle, but is the angle that makes the three positive angles sum to 180° then the third angle will necessarily have a rational number for its half-angle tangent when the first two do (using angle addition and subtraction formulas for tangents) and the triangle can be scaled to a Heronian triangle.

Generally, if K is a subfield of the complex numbers then tan φ/2 ∈ K ∪ {∞} implies that {sin φ, cos φ, tan φ, sec φ, csc φ, cot φ} ⊆ K ∪ {∞}.

== See also ==
- List of trigonometric identities
- Half-side formula
