= Cathetus =

Side of a right triangle

A right-angled triangle where c_{1} and c_{2} are the catheti and h is the hypotenuse

In a right triangle, a cathetus (originally from Greek κάθετος, "perpendicular"; plural: catheti), commonly known as a leg, is either of the sides that are adjacent to the right angle. It is occasionally called a "side about the right angle". The side opposite the right angle is the hypotenuse. In the context of the hypotenuse, the catheti are sometimes referred to simply as "the other two sides".

If the catheti of a right triangle have equal lengths, the triangle is isosceles. If they have different lengths, a distinction can be made between the minor (shorter) and major (longer) cathetus. The ratio of the lengths of the catheti defines the trigonometric functions tangent and cotangent of the acute angles in the triangle: the ratio $c_1/c_2$ is the tangent of the acute angle adjacent to $c_2$ and is also the cotangent of the acute angle adjacent to $c_1$.

In a right triangle, the length of a cathetus is the geometric mean of the length of the adjacent segment cut by the altitude to the hypotenuse and the length of the whole hypotenuse.

By the Pythagorean theorem, the sum of the squares of the lengths of the catheti is equal to the square of the length of the hypotenuse.

In architecture, the term cathetus has been used for the eye of the volute. It was so termed because its position is determined, in an Ionic (or voluted) capital, by a line let down from the point in which the volute generates.
