= Triangular billiards =

Dynamical system involving reflection

Unsolved problem in mathematics
Does every triangle have a periodic billiards path?
More unsolved problems in mathematics

In mathematics, triangular billiards is a dynamical system that models the reflection of light rays within a triangle with mirrored sides, or a billiards ball on a triangular table. It is a special case of dynamical billiards.

A major open problem in this area concerns the existence of periodic billiards paths: does every triangle have a path that repeats its starting position and orientation after a finite number of reflections? A June 2026 preprint by Giovanni Forni claims that yes, all polygons have periodic orbits.

== Problem statement ==
In this model, a light ray with a given initial position and orientation follows a path in the form of a polygonal chain, following the rule that the Angle of incidence equals the angle of reflection whenever the light ray reflects from a side of the triangle. If the light ever reaches a vertex of the triangle, it is extinguished. Alternatively, a billiards ball modeled as a mathematical point follows the same path on a triangular billiards table, again reflecting perfectly when it hits a wall of the table or falling into a pocket at a corner. This is a special case of dynamical billiards, which asks about similar problems in more general shapes than triangles.

== Unfolded paths ==
Instead of following the path of a reflected light ray within a single mirrored triangle, it is convenient to study an equivalent problem of following a straight line through a polygon formed by reflected copies of the triangle. To do this, start with the given triangle, and a line through the given starting point of the path with the given orientation. Then, follow that line to its crossing with a side of the triangle, and place another copy of the triangle, reflected across the crossed side. Continue in the same way in the reflected triangle, repeating until the path traced by the line hits a vertex of the polygon (and stops), or reaches a reflected copy of the triangle that has the same orientation as the starting triangle, with the line passing through corresponding points in both copies. If this happens, a periodic path has been found.

For a sequence of copies of a given triangle, reflected across their sides in this way and starting and ending with copies in the same orientation, a periodic path must have a slope equal to the translation vector from the starting copy to the ending copy. It is possible to test whether a periodic path has this sequence of copies as its unfolding, by computing the convex hulls of the vertices on the two subsets of the boundary of the unfolded polygon connecting the starting and ending copies of the triangle, and testing whether these two hulls have parallel projections onto a line perpendicular to the translation vector that form disjoint sets. If so, any point in the interval between these two sets can be chosen as the starting point for a periodic path.

== Solved cases ==
The orthic triangle of any acute triangle forms a periodic billiards path with three reflections

In an acute triangle, the orthic triangle forms a periodic billiards path, reflecting three times before returning to its starting position. This triangle has as its three vertices the three points on the sides of the given acute triangle where they are crossed by perpendicular lines through the opposite vertices. It also gives the solution to Fagnano's problem of the minimum-perimeter inscribed triangle)

In a right triangle, any reflected path perpendicular to the hypotenuse of the triangle is periodic, reflecting twice from each edge and following the same path in the reversed direction before returning to its starting position. Thus, these triangles always have periodic billiards paths. More generally, almost every path perpendicular to one of the sides of the right triangle is eventually periodic, and when the right triangle has an angle in the interval $(\pi/6,\pi/4)$ there can be at most one non-periodic path that is perpendicular to one side.

For triangles whose angles are rational number multiples of $\pi$, there always exists a periodic billiards path, and more strongly the starting positions and orientations that give rise to periodic paths form a dense set. For isosceles triangles, a path from the midpoint of the base perpendicular to each side reflects four times before repeating. All sufficiently small perturbations of the triangle will produce another triangle with a periodic billiards path.

Computer searches have shown that all obtuse triangles whose maximum angle is at most 112.4°, have periodic billiard paths. The slightly larger angle 112.5° ($5\pi/8$) has been described as "a very hard barrier to pass". Additionally, all obtuse triangles whose minimum angle is at least 11°, except for triangles whose three angles are very close to 15°, 30°, and 135°, have periodic billiard paths.

== Solution properties ==
It is not possible to give a fixed bound on the number of reflections needed for a periodic path: there exist triangles for which this number is arbitrarily large. In particular this is true for certain obtuse triangles whose angles are close to those of the 30-60-90 triangle.

A periodic billiards path in a triangle is called stable if, for all small enough perturbations of the triangle, the path can be perturbed to become periodic for the perturbed triangle. Otherwise, it is called unstable. If all periodic paths were stable, all triangles would be covered by the stable neighborhoods of rational triangles. However, there exist triangles for which all periodic paths are unstable; an example is the 30-60-90 triangle. Every periodic path with an odd number of reflections is stable.
