= Inscribed square in a triangle =

Square whose vertices lie on a triangle

A square inscribed in a triangle: on the right, an acute-angled triangle (3 squares); in the middle, a right-angled triangle (2 squares); on the left, an obtuse-angled triangle (1 square).

The Calabi triangle and the three placements of its largest square. The placement on the long side of the triangle is inscribed; the other two are not.

In elementary geometry, an inscribed square in a triangle is a square whose four vertices all lie on a given triangle. By the pigeonhole principle, two of the square's vertices, and the edge between them, must lie on one of the sides of the triangle. For instance, for the Calabi triangle depicted, the square with horizontal and vertical sides is inscribed; the other two squares in the figure are not inscribed.

This is a special case of the inscribed square problem asking for a square whose vertices lie on a simple closed curve. However, although the inscribed square problem remains unsolved in general, it is known to have a solution for every polygon and for every convex set, two special cases that both apply to triangles. Every acute triangle has three inscribed squares, one lying on each of its three sides. In a right triangle there are two inscribed squares, one touching the right angle of the triangle and the other lying on the opposite side. An obtuse triangle has only one inscribed square, with a side coinciding with part of the triangle's longest side. The Calabi triangle, an obtuse triangle, shares with the equilateral triangle the property of having three different ways of placing the largest square that fits into it, but (because it is obtuse) only one of these three is inscribed.

An inscribed square can cover at most half the area of the triangle it is inscribed into. It is exactly half when the triangle has a side whose altitude (the perpendicular distance from the side to the opposite vertex) equals the length of the side, and when the square is inscribed with its edge on this side of the triangle. In all other cases, the inscribed square is smaller than half the triangle. For a square that lies on a triangle side of length $s$, with altitude $h$, the square's side length will be
$$\frac{sh}{s+h}.$$
It follows from this formula that, for any two inscribed squares in a triangle, the square that lies on the longer side of the triangle will have smaller area. In an acute triangle, the three inscribed squares have side lengths that are all within a factor of
$$\frac23\sqrt2\approx 0.94$$
of each other.
