= Calabi triangle =

Special triangle in geometry

A Calabi triangle is a triangle $ABC$ with three squares, each of which is described as the green region and blue vertices and edges

The Calabi triangle is a special triangle found by Eugenio Calabi.

It is the unique triangle that has 3 different placements for the largest square that it contains, and is not the equilateral triangle. It is an isosceles triangle which is obtuse with an irrational but algebraic ratio between the lengths of its sides and its base.

Consider the largest square that can be placed in an arbitrary triangle. It may be that such a square could be positioned in the triangle in more than one way. In the equilateral triangle, the largest such square can be positioned in three different ways. Calabi found that there is exactly one other case, and so it is named the Calabi triangle.

== Shape ==
The triangle △ABC is isosceles which has the same length of sides as AB = AC. If the ratio of the base to either leg is x, we can set that AB = AC = 1, BC = x. Then we can consider the following three cases:

case 1) △ABC is acute triangle
The condition is $0 < x < \sqrt{2}$.
In this case x = 1 is valid for equilateral triangle.
case 2) △ABC is right triangle
The condition is $x = \sqrt{2}$.
In this case no value is valid.
case 3) △ABC is obtuse triangle
The condition is $\sqrt{2} < x < 2$.
In this case the Calabi triangle is valid for the largest positive root of $2x^3 - 2x^2 - 3x + 2 = 0$ at $x = 1.55138752454832039226...$ ((sequence A046095 in the OEIS)).

Example of answer

Example figure of Calabi triangle 01

Consider the case of AB = AC = 1, BC = x. Then

$$0 < x < 2.$$

Let a base angle be θ and a square be □DEFG on base BC with its side length as a. Let H be the foot of the perpendicular drawn from the apex A to the base. Then

$$\begin{align}
HB &= HC = \cos\theta = \frac{x}{2}, \\
AH &= \sin\theta = \frac{x}{2}\tan\theta , \\
0 &< \theta < \frac{\pi}{2}.
\end{align}$$

Then HB = x/2 and HE = a/2, so EB = (x - a)/2.

From △DEB ∽ △AHB,

$$\begin{align}
& EB : DE = HB : AH \\
&\Leftrightarrow \bigg(\frac{x - a}{2}\bigg) : a = \cos \theta : \sin \theta = 1 : \tan \theta \\
&\Leftrightarrow a = \bigg(\frac{x - a}{2}\bigg)\tan \theta \\
&\Leftrightarrow a = \frac{x \tan \theta}{\tan \theta + 2}. \\
\end{align}$$

=== case 1) △ABC is acute triangle ===
Example figure of Calabi triangle 02

Let □IJKL be a square on side AC with its side length as b. From △ABC ∽ △IBJ,

$$\begin{align}
& AB : IJ = BC : BJ \\
&\Leftrightarrow 1 : b = x : BJ \\
&\Leftrightarrow BJ = bx.
\end{align}$$

From △JKC ∽ △AHC,

$$\begin{align}
& JK : JC = AH : AC \\
&\Leftrightarrow b : JC = \frac{x}{2}\tan\theta : 1 \\
&\Leftrightarrow JC = \frac{2b}{x\tan\theta}.
\end{align}$$

Then

$$\begin{align}
&x = BC = BJ + JC = bx + \frac{2b}{x\tan\theta} \\
&\Leftrightarrow x = b\frac{x^2 \tan\theta + 2}{x\tan\theta} \\
&\Leftrightarrow b = \frac{x^2 \tan\theta}{x^2 \tan\theta + 2}.
\end{align}$$

Therefore, if two squares are congruent,

$$\begin{align}
&a = b \\
&\Leftrightarrow \frac{x \tan \theta}{\tan \theta + 2} = \frac{x^2 \tan\theta}{x^2 \tan\theta + 2} \\
&\Leftrightarrow x\tan\theta\cdot(x^2 \tan\theta + 2) = x^2 \tan\theta(\tan\theta + 2) \\
&\Leftrightarrow x\tan\theta\cdot(x(\tan\theta + 2) - (x^2 \tan\theta + 2)) = 0 \\
&\Leftrightarrow x\tan\theta\cdot(x\tan\theta - 2)\cdot(x - 1) = 0 \\
&\Leftrightarrow 2\sin\theta\cdot2(\sin\theta - 1)\cdot(x - 1) = 0.
\end{align}$$

In this case, $\frac{\pi}{4} < \theta < \frac{\pi}{2}, 2\sin\theta\cdot2(\sin\theta - 1) \ne 0.$

Therefore $x = 1$, it means that △ABC is equilateral triangle.

=== case 2) △ABC is right triangle ===
Example figure of Calabi triangle 03

In this case, $x = \sqrt{2}, \tan\theta = 1$, so $a = \frac{\sqrt{2}}{3}, b = \frac{1}{2}.$

Then no value is valid.

=== case 3) △ABC is obtuse triangle ===
Example figure of Calabi triangle 04

Let □IJKA be a square on base AC with its side length as b.

From △AHC ∽ △JKC,

$$\begin{align}
& AH : HC = JK : KC \\
&\Leftrightarrow \sin\theta : \cos\theta = b : (1-b) \\
&\Leftrightarrow b\cos\theta = (1-b)\sin\theta \\
&\Leftrightarrow b = (1-b)\tan\theta \\
&\Leftrightarrow b = \frac{\tan\theta}{1+\tan\theta}.
\end{align}$$

Therefore, if two squares are congruent,

$$\begin{align}
&a = b \\
&\Leftrightarrow \frac{x \tan \theta}{\tan \theta + 2} = \frac{\tan\theta}{1+\tan\theta} \\
&\Leftrightarrow \frac{x}{\tan \theta + 2} = \frac{1}{1+\tan\theta} \\
&\Leftrightarrow x(\tan\theta + 1) = \tan\theta + 2 \\
&\Leftrightarrow (x - 1)\tan\theta = 2 - x.
\end{align}$$

In this case,

$$\tan\theta = \frac{AH}{CH} = \frac{\sqrt{AC^2 - CH^2}}{CH} = \frac{\sqrt{1 - \left( \frac{x}{2} \right)^2}}{\frac{x}{2}} = \frac{\sqrt{(2+x)(2-x)}}{x}.$$

So, we can input the value of tanθ,

$$\begin{align}
&(x - 1)\tan\theta = 2 - x \\
&\Leftrightarrow (x - 1)\frac{\sqrt{(2 + x)(2 - x)}}{x} = 2 - x \\
&\Leftrightarrow (2 - x)\cdot((x - 1)^2 (2 + x) - x^2 (2 - x)) = 0 \\
&\Leftrightarrow (2 - x)\cdot(2x^3 - 2x^2 - 3x + 2) = 0.
\end{align}$$

In this case, $\sqrt{2} < x < 2$, we can get the following equation:

$$2x^3 - 2x^2 - 3x + 2 = 0.$$

== Root of Calabi's equation ==
If x is the largest positive root of Calabi's equation:

$$2x^3 - 2x^2 - 3x + 2 = 0 , \sqrt{2} < x < 2$$

we can calculate the value of x by following methods.

=== Newton's method ===
We can set the function $f : \mathbb{R} \rarr \mathbb{R}$ as follows:

$$\begin{align}
f(x) &= 2x^3 - 2x^2 -3x + 2, \\
f'(x)&= 6x^2 - 4x - 3 = 6\bigg(x - \frac{1}{3}\bigg)^2 - \frac{11}{3}.
\end{align}$$

The function f is continuous and differentiable on $\mathbb{R}$ and

$$\begin{align}
f(\sqrt{2}) &= \sqrt{2} - 2 < 0, \\
f(2)        &= 4 > 0, \\
f'(x)       &> 0 , \forall x \in [\sqrt{2}, 2].
\end{align}$$

Then f is monotonically increasing function and by Intermediate value theorem, the Calabi's equation f(x) = 0 has unique solution in open interval $\sqrt{2} < x < 2$.

The value of x is calculated by Newton's method as follows:

$$\begin{align}
x_0 &= \sqrt{2}, \\
x_{n+1} &= x_n - \frac{f(x_n)}{f'(x_n)} = \frac{4x_n^3-2x_n^2-2}{6x_n^2-4x_n-3}.
\end{align}$$

Newton's method for the root of Calabi's equation
NO	itaration value
x_{0}	1.41421356237309504880168872420969807856967187537694...
x_{1}	1.58943369375323596617308283187888791370090306159374...
x_{2}	1.55324943049375428807267665439782489231871295592784...
x_{3}	1.55139234383942912142613029570413117306471589987689...
x_{4}	1.55138752458074244056538641010106649611908076010328...
x_{5}	1.55138752454832039226341994813293555945836732015691...
x_{6}	1.55138752454832039226195251026462381516359470986821...
x_{7}	1.55138752454832039226195251026462381516359170380388...

=== Cardano's method ===
The value of x can expressed with complex numbers by using Cardano's method:

$x = {1 \over 3} \Bigg(1 + \sqrt[3]{-23 + 3i \sqrt{237} \over 4} + \sqrt[3]{-23 - 3i \sqrt{237} \over 4} \Bigg) .$ (Note: If we set the polar form of complex number, we can calculate the value of x as follows: $$\begin{align} \alpha           &= re^{i\varphi}=r(\cos\varphi +i\sin\varphi)=\frac{-23 + 3i \sqrt{237}}{4} , \\ r                &= \frac{1}{4}\sqrt{(-23)^2+9 \cdot 237} = \frac{1}{4}\sqrt{2 \cdot 11^3} = \Bigg(\sqrt{\frac{11}{2}}\Bigg)^3, \\ \cos\varphi      &= - \frac{23}{4}\frac{1}{r} = - \frac{23 \cdot 2 \sqrt{2}}{4 \cdot 11 \sqrt{11}} = - \frac{23}{11 \sqrt{22}}, \\ \sqrt[3]{\alpha} &= \sqrt[3]{r}e^{\frac{i\varphi}{3}}=\sqrt[3]{r}\Big(\cos\Big(\frac{\varphi}{3}\Big) +i\sin\Big(\frac{\varphi}{3}\Big)\Big), \\ \sqrt[3]{\alpha} + \sqrt[3]{\bar{\alpha}} &= 2 \sqrt[3]{r} \cos\Big(\frac{\varphi}{3}\Big) = \sqrt{22} \cos\!\bigg( {1 \over 3} \cos^{-1}\!\!\bigg(\!-{23 \over 11 \sqrt{22}} \bigg) \bigg), \\ x &= \frac{1}{3}\bigg(1 + \sqrt[3]{\alpha} + \sqrt[3]{\bar{\alpha}} \bigg) = {1 \over 3} \bigg(1 + \sqrt{22} \cos\!\bigg( {1 \over 3} \cos^{-1}\!\!\bigg(\!-{23 \over 11 \sqrt{22}} \bigg) \bigg) \bigg). \end{align}$$ Then this Cardano's method is equivalent as Viète's method.)

=== Viète's method ===
The value of x can also be expressed without complex numbers by using Viète's method:

$$\begin{align}
x &= {1 \over 3} \bigg(1 + \sqrt{22} \cos\!\bigg( {1 \over 3} \cos^{-1}\!\!\bigg(\!-{23 \over 11 \sqrt{22}} \bigg) \bigg) \bigg) \\
&=  1.55138752454832039226195251026462381516359170380389\cdots .
\end{align}$$

=== Lagrange's method ===
The value of x has continued fraction representation by Lagrange's method as follows:
[1, 1, 1, 4, 2, 1, 2, 1, 5, 2, 1, 3, 1, 1, 390, ...] =

$1 + \cfrac{1}{1 + \cfrac{1}{1 + \cfrac{1}{4 + \cfrac{1}{2 + \cfrac{1}{1 + \cfrac{1}{2 + \cfrac{1}{1 + \cfrac{1}{5 + \cfrac{1}{2 + \cfrac{1}{1 + \cfrac{1}{3 + \cfrac{1}{1 + \cfrac{1}{1 + \cfrac{1}{390 + \cdots }}}}}}}}}}}}}}$. (Note: If a continued fraction [a_{0}, a_{1}, a_{2}, ...] are found, with numerators h_{1}, h_{2}, ... and denominators k_{1}, k_{2}, ... then the relevant recursive relation is that of Gaussian brackets: h_{n} = a_{n}h_{n − 1} + h_{n − 2}, k_{n} = a_{n}k_{n − 1} + k_{n − 2}. The successive convergents are given by the formula h_{n}/k_{n} = (a_{n}h_{n − 1} + h_{n − 2})/(a_{n}k_{n − 1} + k_{n − 2}). If the continued fraction is [1, 1, 1, 4, 2, 1, 2, 1, 5, 2, 1, 3, 1, 1, 390, 1, 1, 2, 11, 6, 2, 1, 1, 56, 1, 4, 3, 1, 1, 6, 9, 3, 2, 1, 8, 10, 9, 25, 2, 1, 3, 1, 3, 5, 2, 35, 1, 1, 1, 41, 1, 2, 2, 1, 2, 2, 3, 1, 4, 2, 1, 1, 1, 1, 3, 1, 6, 2, 1, 4, 11, 1, 2, 2, 1, 1, 6, 3, 1, 1, 1, 1, 1, 1, 4, 1, 7, 2, 2, 2, 36, 7, 22, 1, 2, 1, ...], we can calculate the rational approxmation of x is as follows: The value of numerators h_{n} and denominators k_{n} of continued fraction: n / a_{n} / h_{n} / k_{n}; -2 / / 0 / 1; -1 / / 1 / 0; 0 / 1 / 1 / 1; 1 / 1 / 2 / 1; 2 / 1 / 3 / 2; 3 / 4 / 14 / 9; 4 / 2 / 31 / 20; 5 / 1 / 45 / 29; 6 / 2 / 121 / 78; 7 / 1 / 166 / 107; 8 / 5 / 951 / 613; 9 / 2 / 2068 / 1333; 10 / 1 / 3019 / 1946; 11 / 3 / 11125 / 7171; 12 / 1 / 14144 / 9117; 13 / 1 / 25269 / 16288; 14 / 390 / 9869054 / 6361437; 15 / 1 / 9894323 / 6377725; 16 / 1 / 19763377 / 12739162; 17 / 2 / 49421077 / 31856049; 18 / 11 / 563395224 / 363155701; 19 / 6 / 3429792421 / 2210790255; 20 / 2 / 7422980066 / 4784736211; 21 / 1 / 10852772487 / 6995526466; 22 / 1 / 18275752553 / 11780262677; 23 / 56 / 1034294915455 / 666690236378; 24 / 1 / 1052570668008 / 678470499055; 25 / 4 / 5244577587487 / 3380572232598; 26 / 3 / 16786303430469 / 10820187196849; 27 / 1 / 22030881017956 / 14200759429447; 28 / 1 / 38817184448425 / 25020946626296; 29 / 6 / 254933987708506 / 164326439187223; 30 / 9 / 2333223073824979 / 1503958899311303; 31 / 3 / 7254603209183443 / 4676203137121132; 32 / 2 / 16842429492191865 / 10856365173553567; 33 / 1 / 24097032701375308 / 15532568310674699; 34 / 8 / 209618691103194329 / 135116911658951159; 35 / 10 / 2120283943733318598 / 1366701684900186289; 36 / 9 / 19292174184703061711 / 12435432075760627760; 37 / 25 / 484424638561309861373 / 312252503578915880289; 38 / 2 / 988141451307322784457 / 636940439233592388338; 39 / 1 / 1472566089868632645830 / 949192942812508268627; 40 / 3 / 5405839720913220721947 / 3484519267671117194219; 41 / 1 / 6878405810781853367777 / 4433712210483625462846; 42 / 3 / 26041057153258780825278 / 16785655899121993582757; 43 / 5 / 137083691577075757494167 / 88361991706093593376631; 44 / 2 / 300208440307410295813612 / 193509639311309180336019; 45 / 35 / 10644379102336436110970587 / 6861199367601914905137296; 46 / 1 / 10944587542643846406784199 / 7054709006913224085473315; 47 / 1 / 21588966644980282517754786 / 13915908374515138990610611; 48 / 1 / 32533554187624128924538985 / 20970617381428363076083926; 49 / 41 / 1355464688337569568423853171 / 873711221013078025110051577; 50 / 1 / 1387998242525193697348392156 / 894681838394506388186135503; 51 / 2 / 4131461173387956963120637483 / 2663074897802090801482322583; 52 / 2 / 9650920589301107623589667122 / 6220831633998687991150780669; 53 / 1 / 13782381762689064586710304605 / 8883906531800778792633103252; 54 / 2 / 37215684114679236797010276332 / 23988644697600245576416987173; 55 / 2 / 88213749992047538180730857269 / 56861195927001269945467077598; 56 / 3 / 301856934090821851339202848139 / 194572232478604055412818219967; 57 / 1 / 390070684082869389519933705408 / 251433428405605325358285297565; 58 / 4 / 1862139670422299409418937669771 / 1200305946101025356845959410227; 59 / 2 / 4114350024927468208357809044950 / 2652045320607656039050204118019; 60 / 1 / 5976489695349767617776746714721 / 3852351266708681395896163528246; 61 / 1 / 10090839720277235826134555759671 / 6504396587316337434946367646265; 62 / 1 / 16067329415627003443911302474392 / 10356747854025018830842531174511; 63 / 1 / 26158169135904239270045858234063 / 16861144441341356265788898820776; 64 / 3 / 94541836823339721254048877176581 / 60940181178049087628209227636839; 65 / 1 / 120700005959243960524094735410644 / 77801325619390443893998126457615; 66 / 6 / 818741872578803484398617289640445 / 527748134894391750992197986382529; 67 / 2 / 1758183751116850929321329314691534 / 1133297595408173945878394099222673; 68 / 1 / 2576925623695654413719946604331979 / 1661045730302565696870592085605202; 69 / 4 / 12065886245899468584201115732019450 / 7777480516618436733360762441643481; 70 / 11 / 135301674328589808839932219656545929 / 87213331413105369763838978943683493; 71 / 1 / 147367560574489277424133335388565379 / 94990811929723806497199741385326974; 72 / 2 / 430036795477568363688198890433676687 / 277194955272552982758238461714337441; 73 / 2 / 1007441151529626004800531116255918753 / 649380722474829772013676664814001856; 74 / 1 / 1437477947007194368488730006689595440 / 926575677747382754771915126528339297; 75 / 1 / 2444919098536820373289261122945514193 / 1575956400222212526785591791342341153; 76 / 6 / 16106992538228116608224296744362680598 / 10382314079080657915485465874582386215; 77 / 3 / 50765896713221170197962151356033555987 / 32722898637464186273241989415089499798; 78 / 1 / 66872889251449286806186448100396236585 / 43105212716544844188727455289671886013; 79 / 1 / 117638785964670457004148599456429792572 / 75828111354009030461969444704761385811; 80 / 1 / 184511675216119743810335047556826029157 / 118933324070553874650696899994433271824; 81 / 1 / 302150461180790200814483647013255821729 / 194761435424562905112666344699194657635; 82 / 1 / 486662136396909944624818694570081850886 / 313694759495116779763363244693627929459; 83 / 1 / 788812597577700145439302341583337672615 / 508456194919679684876029589392822587094; 84 / 4 / 3641912526707710526382028060903432541346 / 2347519539173835519267481602264918277835; 85 / 1 / 4430725124285410671821330402486770213961 / 2855975734093515204143511191657740864929; 86 / 7 / 34656988396705585229131340878310824039073 / 22339349677828441948272059943869104332338; 87 / 2 / 73744701917696581130084012159108418292107 / 47534675089750399100687631079395949529605; 88 / 2 / 182146392232098747489299365196527660623287 / 117408699857329240149647322102661003391548; 89 / 2 / 438037486381894076108682742552163739538681 / 282352074804408879399982275284717956312701; 90 / 36 / 15951495901980285487401878097074422284015803 / 10282083392816048898549009232352507430648784; 91 / 7 / 112098508800243892487921829422073119727649302 / 72256935824516751169243046901752269970854189; 92 / 22 / 2482118689507345920221682125382683056292300447 / 1599934671532184574621896041070902446789440942; 93 / 1 / 2594217198307589812709603954804756176019949749 / 1672191607356701325791139087972654716760295131; 94 / 2 / 7670553086122525545640890034992195408332199945 / 4944317886245587226204174217016211880310031204; 95 / 1 / 10264770284430115358350493989796951584352149694 / 6616509493602288551995313304988866597070326335; The rational approxmation of x is h_{95}/k_{95} and an error bounds ε is as follows: $$\begin{align} x &\approx \frac{h_{95}}{k_{95}} \\ &= \frac{10264770284430115358350493989796951584352149694}{6616509493602288551995313304988866597070326335} \\ &= 1.5513875245483203922619525102646238151635917038038871995280071201179267425542569572957604536135484903\cdots, \\ \varepsilon &= \frac{1}{k_{95}(k_{95}+k_{94})} \\ &= 1.82761... \times 10^{-91}. \end{align}$$)

== Base angle and Apex angle ==
The Calabi triangle is obtuse with base angle θ and apex angle ψ as follows:

$$\begin{align}
\theta &= \cos^{-1}(x/2) \\
&= 39.13202614232587442003651601935656349795831966723206\cdots^\circ, \\
\psi   &= 180 - 2\theta \\
&= 101.73594771534825115992696796128687300408336066553587\cdots^\circ. \\
\end{align}$$

== See also ==
- Biggest little polygon
- Cubic equation
- Inscribed square in a triangle
