= Inscribed square problem =

Unsolved problem about inscribing a square in a Jordan curve

Unsolved problem in mathematics
Does every Jordan curve have an inscribed square?
More unsolved problems in mathematics

Example: The black dashed curve goes through all corners of several blue squares.

The inscribed square problem, also known as the square peg problem or the Toeplitz conjecture, is an unsolved question in geometry: Does every plane simple closed curve contain all four vertices of some square? This is true if the curve is convex or piecewise smooth and in other special cases. The problem was proposed by Otto Toeplitz in 1911. Some early positive results were obtained by Arnold Emch and Lev Schnirelmann. The general case remains open.

== Problem statement ==
Let $C$ be a Jordan curve. A polygon $P$ is inscribed in $C$ if all vertices of $P$ belong to $C$. The inscribed square problem asks:

Does every Jordan curve admit an inscribed square?

It is not required that the vertices of the square appear along the curve in any particular order.

== Examples ==
Some figures, such as circles and squares, admit infinitely many inscribed squares. There is one inscribed square in a triangle for any obtuse triangle, two squares for any right triangle, and three squares for any acute triangle.

== Resolved cases ==
It is tempting to attempt to solve the inscribed square problem by proving that a special class of well-behaved curves always contains an inscribed square, and then to approximate an arbitrary curve by a sequence of well-behaved curves and infer that there still exists an inscribed square as a limit of squares inscribed in the curves of the sequence. One reason this argument has not been carried out to completion is that the limit of a sequence of squares may be a single point rather than itself being a square. Nevertheless, many special cases of curves are now known to have an inscribed square.

=== Piecewise analytic curves ===
Arnold Emch (1916) showed that piecewise analytic curves always have inscribed squares. In particular this is true for polygons. Emch's proof considers the curves traced out by the midpoints of secant line segments to the curve, parallel to a given line. He shows that, when these curves are intersected with the curves generated in the same way for a perpendicular family of secants, there are an odd number of crossings. Therefore, there always exists at least one crossing, which forms the center of a rhombus inscribed in the given curve. By rotating the two perpendicular lines continuously through a right angle, and applying the intermediate value theorem, he shows that at least one of these rhombi is a square.

=== Locally monotone curves ===
Stromquist has proved that every local monotone plane simple curve admits an inscribed square. The condition for the admission to happen is that for any point p, the curve C should be locally represented as a graph of a function $y=f(x)$.

In more precise terms, for any given point $p$ on $C$, there is a neighborhood $U(p)$ and a fixed direction $n(p)$ (the direction of the “$y$-axis”) such that no chord of $C$ -in this neighborhood- is parallel to $n(p)$.

Locally monotone curves include all types of polygons, all closed convex curves, and all piecewise $C^1$ curves without any cusps.

=== Curves without special trapezoids ===
An even weaker condition on the curve than local monotonicity is that, for some $\varepsilon>0$, the curve does not have any inscribed special trapezoids of size $\varepsilon$. A special trapezoid is an isosceles trapezoid with three equal sides, each longer than the fourth side, inscribed in the curve with a vertex ordering consistent with the clockwise ordering of the curve itself. Its size is the length of the part of the curve that extends around the three equal sides. Here, this length is measured in the domain of a fixed parametrization of $C$, as $C$ may not be rectifiable. Instead of a limit argument, the proof is based on relative obstruction theory. This condition is open and dense in the space of all Jordan curves with respect to the compact-open topology. In this sense, the inscribed square problem is solved for generic curves.

=== Curves in annuli ===
If a Jordan curve is inscribed in an annulus whose outer radius is at most $1+\sqrt{2}$ times its inner radius, and it is drawn in such a way that it separates the inner circle of the annulus from the outer circle, then it contains an inscribed square. In this case, if the given curve is approximated by some well-behaved curve, then any large squares that contain the center of the annulus and are inscribed in the approximation are topologically separated from smaller inscribed squares that do not contain the center. The limit of a sequence of large squares must again be a large square, rather than a degenerate point, so the limiting argument may be used.

=== Symmetric curves ===
The affirmative answer is also known for centrally symmetric curves, even fractals such as the Koch snowflake, and curves with reflective symmetry across a line.

=== Lipschitz graphs ===
In 2017, Terence Tao published a proof of the existence of a square in curves formed by the union of the graphs of two functions, both of which have the same value at the endpoints of the curves and both of which obey a Lipschitz continuity condition with Lipschitz constant less than one. Tao also formulated several related conjectures. In 2024, Joshua Greene and Andrew Lobb published a preprint improving this result to curves with Lipschitz constant less than $1 + \sqrt{2}$.

=== Jordan curves close to a C^{2} Jordan curve ===
In March 2022, Gregory R. Chambers showed that if $\gamma$ is a Jordan curve which is close to a $C^2$ Jordan curve $\beta$ in $\mathbb{R}^2$, then $\gamma$ contains an inscribed square. He showed that, if $\kappa>0$ is the maximum unsigned curvature of $\beta$ and there is a map $f$ from the image of $\gamma$ to the image of $\beta$ with $\|f(x)-x\|<1/10\kappa$ and $f\circ\gamma$ having winding number $1$, then $\gamma$ has an inscribed square of positive sidelength.

== Variants and generalizations ==
One may ask whether other shapes can be inscribed into an arbitrary Jordan curve. It is known that for any triangle $T$ and Jordan curve $C$, there is a triangle similar to $T$ and inscribed in $C$. Moreover, the set of the vertices of such triangles is dense in $C$. In particular, there is always an inscribed equilateral triangle.

It is also known that any Jordan curve admits an inscribed rectangle. This was proved by Vaughan by reducing the problem to the non-embeddability of the projective plane in $\mathbb{R}^3$; his proof from around 1977 is published in Meyerson. In 2020, Morales and Villanueva characterized locally connected plane continua that admit at least one inscribed rectangle. In 2020, Joshua Evan Greene and Andrew Lobb proved that for every smooth Jordan curve $C$ and rectangle $R$ in the Euclidean plane there exists a rectangle similar to $R$ whose vertices lie on $C$. This generalizes both the existence of rectangles (of arbitrary shape) and the existence of squares on smooth curves, which has been known since the work of Šnirel'man (1944). In 2021, Greene and Lobb extended their 2020 result and proved that every smooth Jordan curve inscribes every cyclic quadrilateral (modulo an orientation-preserving similarity).

Some generalizations of the inscribed square problem consider inscribed polygons for curves and even more general continua in higher dimensional Euclidean spaces. For example, Stromquist proved that every continuous closed curve $C$ in $\mathbb{R}^n$ satisfying "Condition A", that no two chords of $C$ in a suitable neighborhood of any point are perpendicular, admits an inscribed quadrilateral with equal sides and equal diagonals. This class of curves includes all $C^2$ curves. Nielsen and Wright proved that any symmetric continuum $K$ in $\mathbb{R}^n$ contains many inscribed rectangles.
