= Arnold Emch =

American mathematician (1871–1959)

Arnold Frederick Emch (24 March 1871 in Hessigkofen, Switzerland–1959) was a Swiss-American mathematician, known for his work on the inscribed square problem.

After studying at ETH Zurich from 1890 to 1893, Emch traveled to America, and received his Ph.D. in 1895 at the University of Kansas under the supervision of Henry Byron Newson. In the late 1890s until 1905, he was an assistant professor of graphic mathematics in the school of engineering at the Kansas State Agricultural College (now Kansas State University). In 1905, Emch became a professor of mathematics at the Kantonsschule in Solothurn, Switzerland. In 1908, Emch gave a lecture at the International Congress of Mathematicians in Rome. From 1911 to 1939, he was a professor at the University of Illinois Urbana-Champaign.

His wife was Hilda Walters Emch and they had two sons, Walter Emch and Arnold Frederick Emch, a well-known management consultant.

== Selected publications ==
- Projective groups of perspective collineations in the plane treated synthetically. 1896. (PhD dissertation)
- Introduction to projective geometry and its applications; an analytic and synthetic treatment, by Arnold Emch. J. Wiley & sons; Chapman & Hall, limited. 1905.
- Reise und kulturbilder aus den Vereinigten Staaten von Amerika, insbesondere aus dem "fernen Westen.". 1908.
- Emch, Arnold (1913). "Some properties of closed convex curves in a plane". American Journal of Mathematics. 35 (4): 407–412. doi:10.2307/2370404. JSTOR 2370404.
- Emch, Arnold (February 1921). "On the construction and modelling of algebraic surfaces". The American Mathematical Monthly. 28 (2): 46–54. doi:10.2307/2973033. JSTOR 2973033.
- Mathematical models. 1921.
- Emch, Arnold (1924). "Some problems of closure connected with the Geiser transformation". Bull. Amer. Math. Soc. 30 (9–10): 527–535. doi:10.1090/S0002-9904-1924-03950-0. MR 1560958.
- Emch, Arnold (1925). "On the Weddle surface and analogous loci". Trans. Amer. Math. Soc. 27 (3): 270–278. doi:10.1090/s0002-9947-1925-1501311-7. MR 1501311.
- Emch, Arnold (1926). "On the discriminant of ternary forms and a certain class of surfaces". Trans. Amer. Math. Soc. 28 (3): 432–434. doi:10.1090/s0002-9947-1926-1501356-8. MR 1501356.
- Selected topics in algebraic geometry: report of the Committee on rational transformations: Virgil Snyder, Arthur B. Coble, Arnold Emch, Solomon Lefschetz, F. R. Sharpe, Charles H. Sisam. National Research Council (U.S.). 1928.
- Emch, Arnold (1929). "Triple and multiple systems, their geometric configurations and groups". Trans. Amer. Math. Soc. 31 (1): 25–42. doi:10.2307/1989395. JSTOR 1989395.
- Emch, Arnold (1930). "On algebraic surfaces which are invariant in a certain class of finite collineation groups". Bull. Amer. Math. Soc. 36 (8): 547–552. doi:10.1090/s0002-9904-1930-04993-9. MR 1561992.
- Emch, Arnold (1939). "New point configurations and algebraic curves connected with them". Bull. Amer. Math. Soc. 45 (10): 731–735. doi:10.1090/s0002-9904-1939-07066-3. MR 0000490.
