= Diagonal method =

Photography

Diagonal method of a 3:2 image

The diagonal method (DM) is a rule of thumb in photography, painting, and drawing. Dutch photographer and lecturer Edwin Westhoff discovered the method when, after having long taught the rule of thirds in photography courses, he conducted visual experiments to investigate why this rule of thirds only loosely prescribes that points of interest should be placed more or less near the intersection of lines, rather than being rigid and demanding placement to be precisely on these intersections. Having studied many photographs, paintings and etchings, he discovered that details of interest were often placed precisely on the diagonals of a square, instead of any "strong points" that the rule of thirds or the photographic adaptation of the golden ratio suggests. A photograph is usually a rectangular shape with a ratio of 4:3 or 3:2, from which the diagonals of the photograph are placed at the bisection of each corner. Manually placing certain elements of interest on these lines results in a more pleasing photograph.

== Theory ==
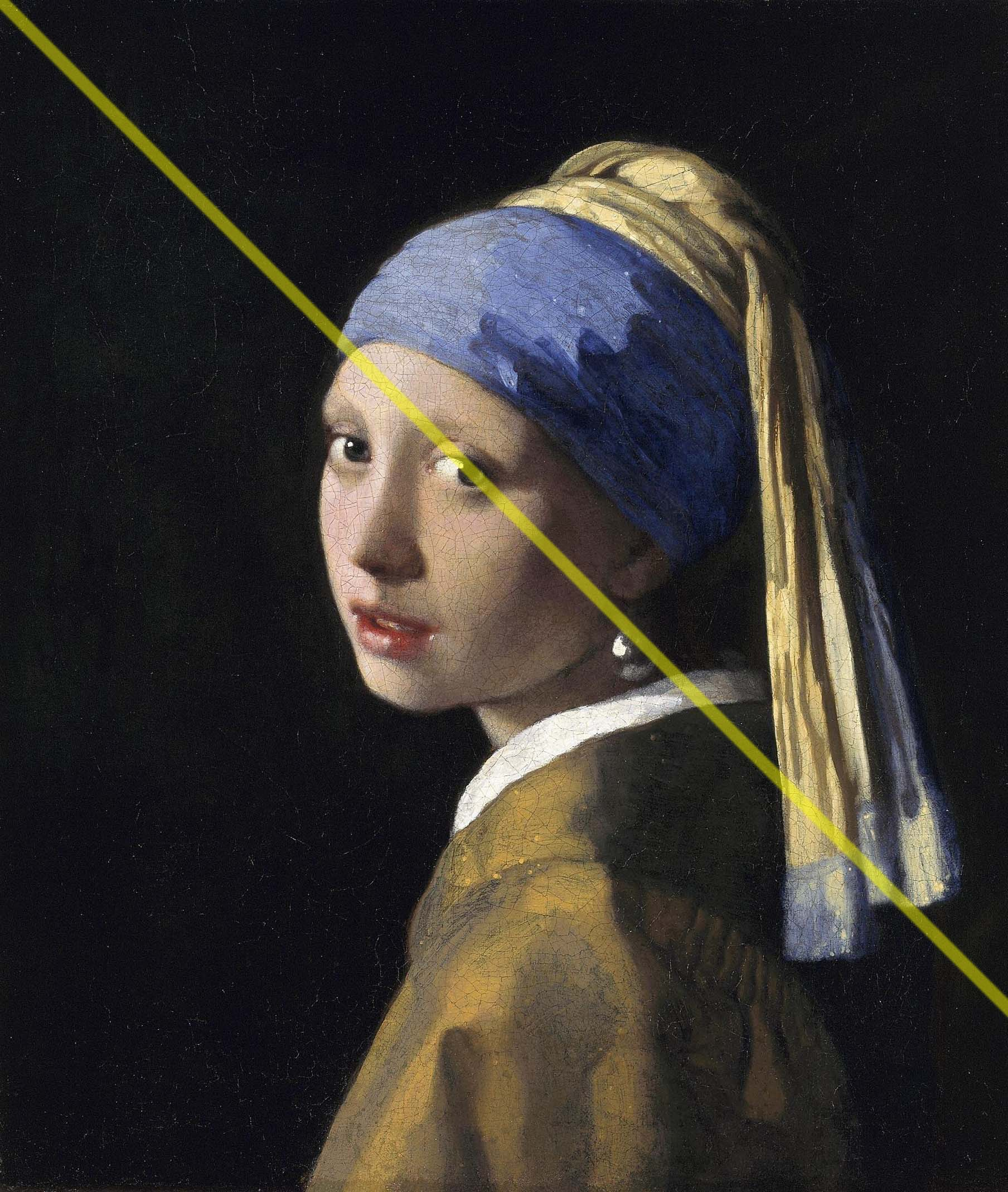
Example using Vermeer's Girl with a Pearl Earring. The yellow diagonal line intersects two main points of interest: the girl's left eye and the pearl earring.

Diagonals, the middle perpendiculars, the center and the corners of a square are said to comprise the force lines in a square, and are regarded by some as more powerful than other parts in a square.

According to the DM, details that are of interest (to the artist and the viewer) are placed on one or more diagonals of 45 degrees from the four corners of the image. Contrary to other rules of thumb involving composition, such as the rule of thirds and the golden ratio, the DM does not ascribe value to the intersections of its lines. Rather, a detail of interest can be located on any point of the four bisections, to which the viewer’s attention will be drawn. However, the DM is very strict about placing details exactly on the bisection, allowing for a maximum deviation of one millimeter on an A4-sized picture. Another difference from other rules of thumb is that the DM is not used for improve composition.

== Application ==
The diagonal method was derived from an analysis of how artists intuitively locate details within a composition, and can be used for such analyses. Westhoff discovered that by drawing lines with an angle of 45 degrees from the corners of an image, one can find out which details the artist (deliberately or unconsciously) intended to emphasize. Artists and photographers intuitively place areas of interest within a composition. The DM can assist in determining which details the artist wishes to emphasize. Research by Westhoff has resulted in the finding that important details in paintings and on etchings of Rembrandt, such as eyes, hands or utilities, were placed exactly on the diagonals.

It is very difficult to consciously place points of attention precisely on the diagonals during the making of photos or artworks, yet it is possible to do this in post-production using guidelines. For instance, the DM can be applied to move the subject of a picture further into a corner.

The DM can only be applied to images where certain details are supposed to be emphasized or exaggerated, such as a portrait in which a specific body part deserves extra attention by the viewer, or a photograph for advertising a product. Photographs of landscapes and architecture usually rely on the composition as a whole, or have lines other than the bisections to determine the composition, such as the horizon. Only if the picture includes details such as persons, (standalone) trees, or buildings is the DM applicable.

== See also ==
- Golden triangle (composition) Another way to use diagonal lines to place elements in a composition
