= Isosceles triangle =

Triangle with at least two sides congruent

- Isosceles triangle
- Type: triangle
- Edges and vertices: 3
- Schläfli symbol: ( ) ∨ { }
- Symmetry group: Dihedral symmetry of order 2, $\mathrm{Dih}_2$
- Properties: convex, cyclic
- Dual polygon: Self-dual

In geometry, an isosceles triangle (/aɪˈsɒsəliːz/) is a triangle that has two sides of equal length and two angles of equal measure. Sometimes it is specified as having exactly two sides of equal length, and sometimes as having at least two sides of equal length, the latter version thus including the equilateral triangle as a special case. Examples of isosceles triangles include the isosceles right triangle, the golden triangle, and the faces of bipyramids and certain Catalan solids.

The mathematical study of isosceles triangles dates back to ancient Egyptian mathematics and Babylonian mathematics. Isosceles triangles have been used as decoration from even earlier times, and appear frequently in architecture and design, for instance in the pediments and gables of buildings.

The two equal sides are called the legs and the third side is called the base of the triangle. The other dimensions of the triangle, such as its height, area, and perimeter, can be calculated by simple formulas from the lengths of the legs and base. Every isosceles triangle has reflection symmetry across the perpendicular bisector of its base, which passes through the opposite vertex and divides the triangle into a pair of congruent right triangles. The two equal angles at the base (opposite the legs) are always acute, so the classification of the triangle as acute, right, or obtuse depends only on the angle between its two legs.

== Terminology, classification, and examples ==
Euclid defined an isosceles triangle as a triangle with exactly two equal sides, but modern treatments prefer to define isosceles triangles as having at least two equal sides. The difference between these two definitions is that the modern version makes equilateral triangles (with three equal sides) a special case of isosceles triangles. A triangle that is not isosceles (having three unequal sides) is called scalene. "Isosceles" is made from the Greek roots "isos" (equal) and "skelos" (leg). The same word is used, for instance, for isosceles trapezoids, trapezoids with two equal sides, and for isosceles sets, sets of points every three of which form an isosceles triangle.

In an isosceles triangle that has exactly two equal sides and two equal faces, the equal sides are called legs and the third side is called the base. The angle included by the legs is called the vertex angle and the angles that have the base as one of their sides are called the base angles. The vertex opposite the base is called the apex. In the equilateral triangle case, since all sides are equal, any side can be called the base.

Special isosceles triangles

Isosceles right triangle

Three congruent inscribed squares in the Calabi triangle

A golden triangle subdivided into a smaller golden triangle and golden gnomon

The triakis triangular tiling

Catalan solids with isosceles triangle faces

Triakis tetrahedron

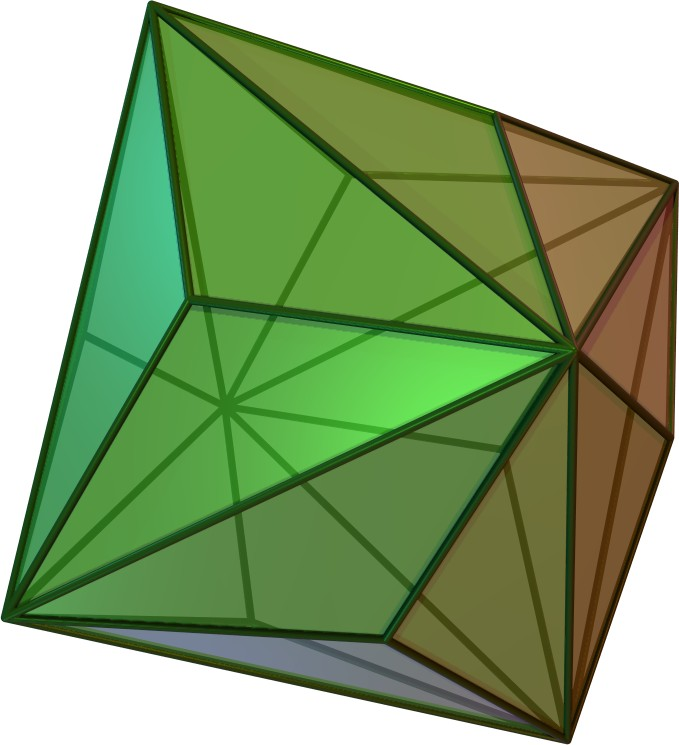
Triakis octahedron

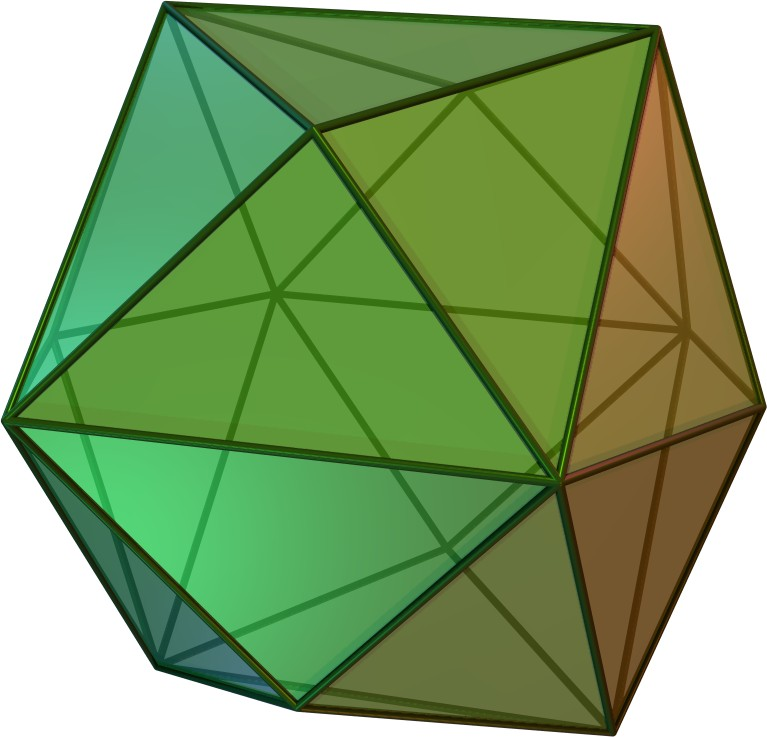
Tetrakis hexahedron

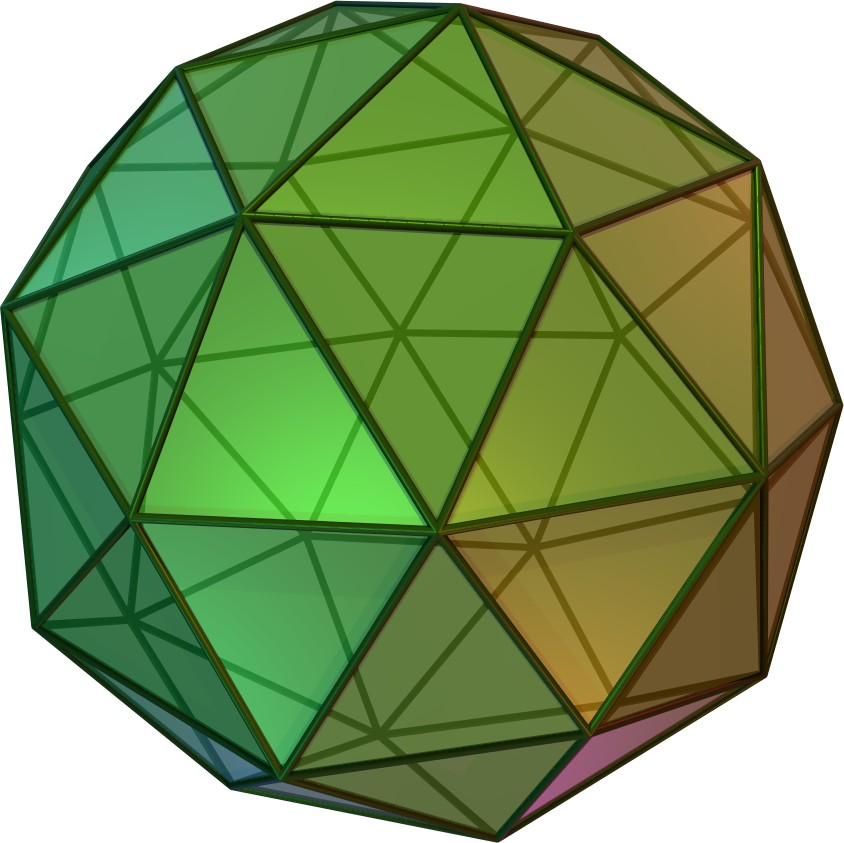
Pentakis dodecahedron

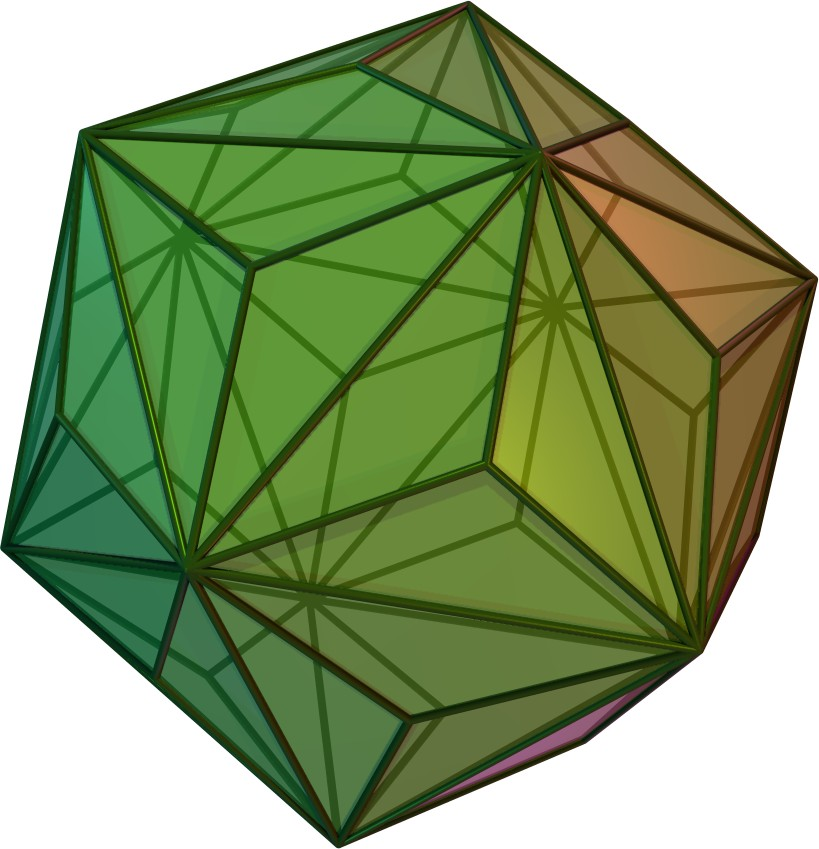
Triakis icosahedron

Whether an isosceles triangle is acute, right or obtuse depends only on the angle at its apex. In Euclidean geometry, the base angles can not be obtuse (greater than 90°) or right (equal to 90°) because their measures would sum to at least 180°, the total of all angles in any Euclidean triangle. Since a triangle is obtuse or right if and only if one of its angles is obtuse or right, respectively, an isosceles triangle is obtuse, right or acute if and only if its apex angle is respectively obtuse, right or acute. In Edwin Abbott's book Flatland, this classification of shapes was used as a satire of social hierarchy: isosceles triangles represented the working class, with acute isosceles triangles higher in the hierarchy than right or obtuse isosceles triangles.

As well as the isosceles right triangle, several other specific shapes of isosceles triangles have been studied. These include the Calabi triangle (a triangle with three congruent inscribed squares), the golden triangle and golden gnomon (two isosceles triangles whose sides and base are in the golden ratio), the 80-80-20 triangle appearing in the Langley's Adventitious Angles puzzle, and the 30-30-120 triangle of the triakis triangular tiling. Five Catalan solids, the triakis tetrahedron, triakis octahedron, tetrakis hexahedron, pentakis dodecahedron, and triakis icosahedron, each have isosceles-triangle faces, as do infinitely many pyramids and bipyramids.

== Formulas ==
=== Height ===
For any isosceles triangle, the following six line segments coincide:

- the altitude, a line segment from the apex perpendicular to the base,
- the angle bisector from the apex to the base,
- the median from the apex to the midpoint of the base,
- the perpendicular bisector of the base within the triangle,
- the segment within the triangle of the unique axis of symmetry of the triangle, and
- the segment within the triangle of the Euler line of the triangle, except when the triangle is equilateral.

Their common length is the height $h$ of the triangle. If the triangle has equal sides of length $a$ and base of length $b$, the general triangle formulas for the lengths of these segments all simplify to

$$h=\sqrt{a^2-\frac{b^2}{4}}.$$

This formula can also be derived from the Pythagorean theorem using the fact that the altitude bisects the base and partitions the isosceles triangle into two congruent right triangles.

Isosceles triangle showing its circumcenter (blue), centroid (red), incenter (green), and symmetry axis (purple)

The Euler line of any triangle goes through the triangle's orthocenter (the intersection of its three altitudes), its centroid (the intersection of its three medians), and its circumcenter (the intersection of the perpendicular bisectors of its three sides, which is also the center of the circumcircle that passes through the three vertices). In an isosceles triangle with exactly two equal sides, these three points are distinct, and (by symmetry) all lie on the symmetry axis of the triangle, from which it follows that the Euler line coincides with the axis of symmetry. The incenter of the triangle also lies on the Euler line, something that is not true for other triangles. If any two of an angle bisector, median, or altitude coincide in a given triangle, that triangle must be isosceles.

=== Area ===
The area $T$ of an isosceles triangle can be derived from the formula for its height, and from the general formula for the area of a triangle as half the product of base and height:

$$T=\frac{b}{4}\sqrt{4a^2-b^2}.$$

The same area formula can also be derived from Heron's formula for the area of a triangle from its three sides. However, applying Heron's formula directly can be numerically unstable for isosceles triangles with very sharp angles, because of the near-cancellation between the semiperimeter and side length in those triangles.

If the apex angle $(\theta)$ and leg lengths $(a)$ of an isosceles triangle are known, then the area of that triangle is:

$$T=\frac{1}{2}a^2\sin\theta.$$

This is a special case of the general formula for the area of a triangle as half the product of two sides times the sine of the included angle.

=== Perimeter ===
The perimeter $p$ of an isosceles triangle with equal sides $a$ and base $b$ is just

$$p = 2a + b.$$

As in any triangle, the area $T$ and perimeter $p$ are related by the isoperimetric inequality

$$p^2>12\sqrt{3}T.$$

This is a strict inequality for isosceles triangles with sides unequal to the base, and becomes an equality for the equilateral triangle. The area, perimeter, and base can also be related to each other by the equation

$$2pb^3 -p^2b^2 + 16T^2 = 0.$$

If the base and perimeter are fixed, then this formula determines the area of the resulting isosceles triangle, which is the maximum possible among all triangles with the same base and perimeter. On the other hand, if the area and perimeter are fixed, this formula can be used to recover the base length, but not uniquely: there are in general two distinct isosceles triangles with given area $T$ and perimeter $p$. When the isoperimetric inequality becomes an equality, there is only one such triangle, which is equilateral.

=== Angle bisector length ===
If the two equal sides have length $a$ and the other side has length $b$, then the internal angle bisector $t$ from one of the two equal-angled vertices satisfies

$$\frac{2ab}{a+b} > t > \frac{ab\sqrt{2}}{a+b}$$

as well as

$$t<\frac{4a}{3};$$

and conversely, if the latter condition holds, an isosceles triangle parametrized by $a$ and $t$ exists.

The Steiner–Lehmus theorem states that every triangle with two angle bisectors of equal length is isosceles. It was formulated in 1840 by C. L. Lehmus. Its other namesake, Jakob Steiner, was one of the first to provide a solution. Although originally formulated only for internal angle bisectors, it works for many (but not all) cases when, instead, two external angle bisectors are equal. The 30-30-120 isosceles triangle makes a boundary case for this variation of the theorem, as it has four equal angle bisectors (two internal, two external).

=== Radii ===
Isosceles triangle with the inscribed and circumscribed circles

The inradius and circumradius formulas for an isosceles triangle may be derived from their formulas for arbitrary triangles. The radius of the inscribed circle of an isosceles triangle with side length $a$, base $b$, and height $h$ is:

$$\frac{2ab-b^2}{4h}.$$

The center of the circle lies on the symmetry axis of the triangle, this distance above the base. An isosceles triangle has the largest possible inscribed circle among the triangles with the same base and apex angle, as well as also having the largest area and perimeter among the same class of triangles.

The radius of the circumscribed circle is:

$$\frac{a^2}{2h}.$$

The center of the circle lies on the symmetry axis of the triangle, this distance below the apex.

=== Inscribed square ===
A square $DEFG$ inscribed in an isosceles triangle $ABC$

For any isosceles triangle, there is a unique square with one side collinear with the base of the triangle and the opposite two corners on its sides. The Calabi triangle is a special isosceles triangle with the property that the other two inscribed squares, with sides collinear with the sides of the triangle, are of the same size as the base square. A much older theorem, preserved in the works of Hero of Alexandria, states that, for an isosceles triangle with base $b$ and height $h$, the side length of the inscribed square on the base of the triangle is

$$\frac{bh}{b+h}.$$

== Isosceles triangulation of other shapes ==
Partition of a cyclic pentagon into isosceles triangles by radii of its circumcircle

For any integer $n \ge 4$, any triangle can be triangulated into $n$ isosceles triangles. In a right triangle, the median from the hypotenuse (that is, the line segment from the midpoint of the hypotenuse to the right-angled vertex) triangulates the right triangle into two isosceles triangles. This is because the midpoint of the hypotenuse is the center of the circumcircle of the right triangle, and each of the two triangles created by the triangulation has two equal radii as two of its sides. Similarly, an acute triangle can be partitioned into three isosceles triangles by segments from its circumcenter, but this method does not work for obtuse triangles, because the circumcenter lies outside the triangle.

Generalizing the triangulation of an acute triangle, any cyclic polygon that contains the center of its circumscribed circle can be triangulated into isosceles triangles by the radii of this circle through its vertices. The fact that all radii of a circle have equal length implies that all of these triangles are isosceles. This partition can be used to derive a formula for the area of the polygon as a function of its side lengths, even for cyclic polygons that do not contain their circumcenters. This formula generalizes Heron's formula for triangles and Brahmagupta's formula for cyclic quadrilaterals.

Either diagonal of a rhombus triangulated it into two congruent isosceles triangles. Similarly, one of the two diagonals of a kite triangulates it into two isosceles triangles, which are not congruent except when the kite is a rhombus.

== Applications ==
=== In architecture and design ===
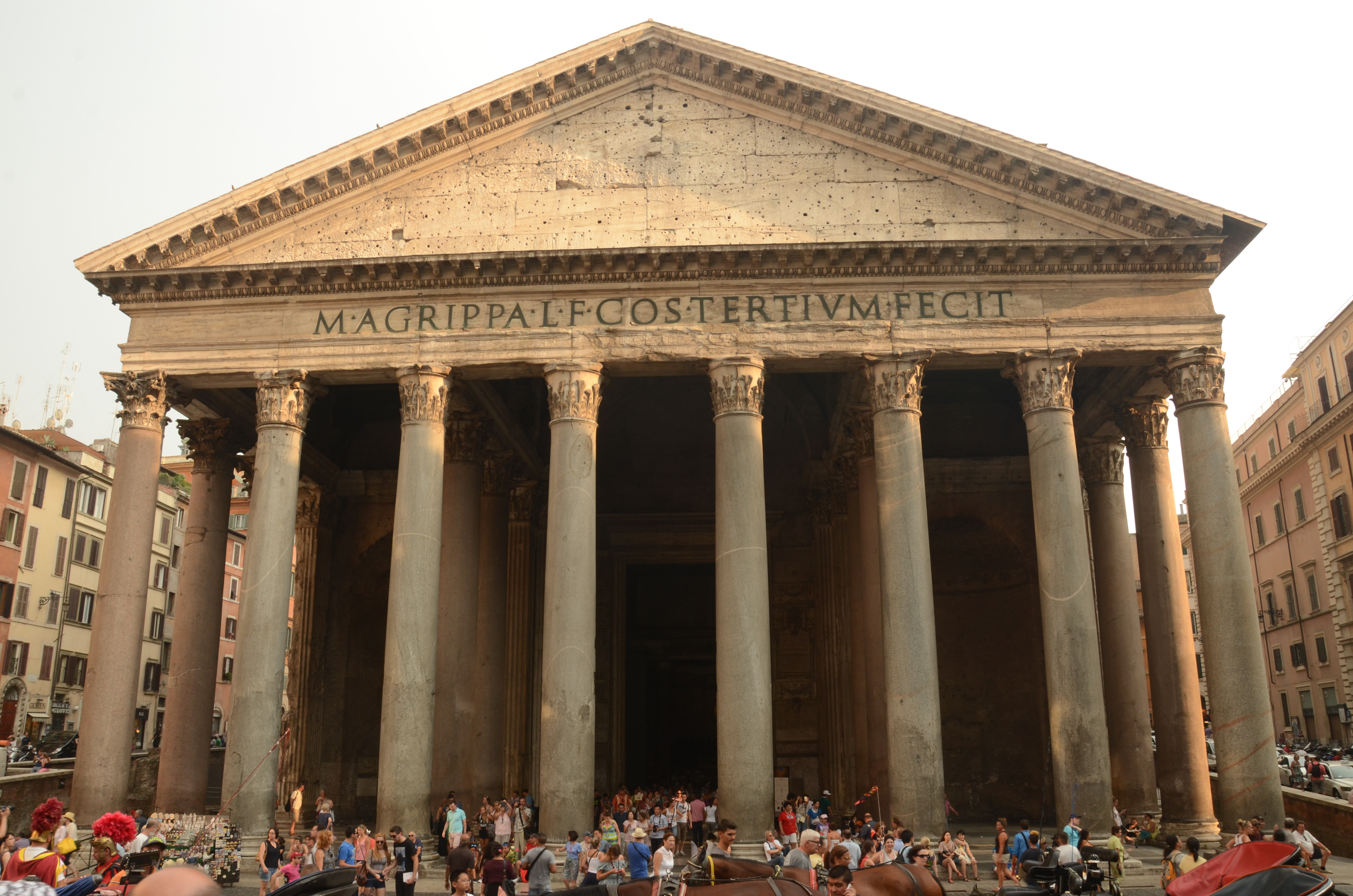
Obtuse isosceles pediment of the Pantheon, Rome

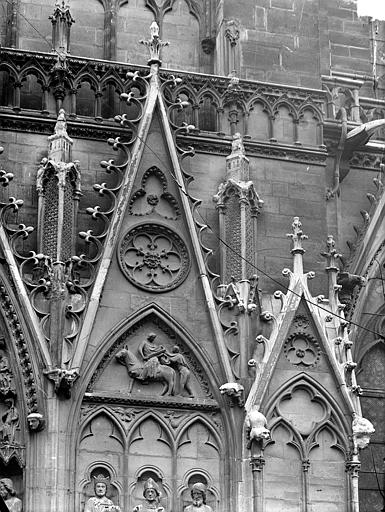
Acute isosceles gable over the Saint-Etienne portal, Notre-Dame de Paris

Isosceles triangles commonly appear in architecture as the shapes of gables and pediments. In ancient Greek architecture and its later imitations, the obtuse isosceles triangle was used; in Gothic architecture this was replaced by the acute isosceles triangle.

In the architecture of the Middle Ages, another isosceles triangle shape became popular: the Egyptian isosceles triangle. This is an isosceles triangle that is acute, but less so than the equilateral triangle; its height is proportional to 5/8 of its base. The Egyptian isosceles triangle was brought back into use in modern architecture by Dutch architect Hendrik Petrus Berlage.

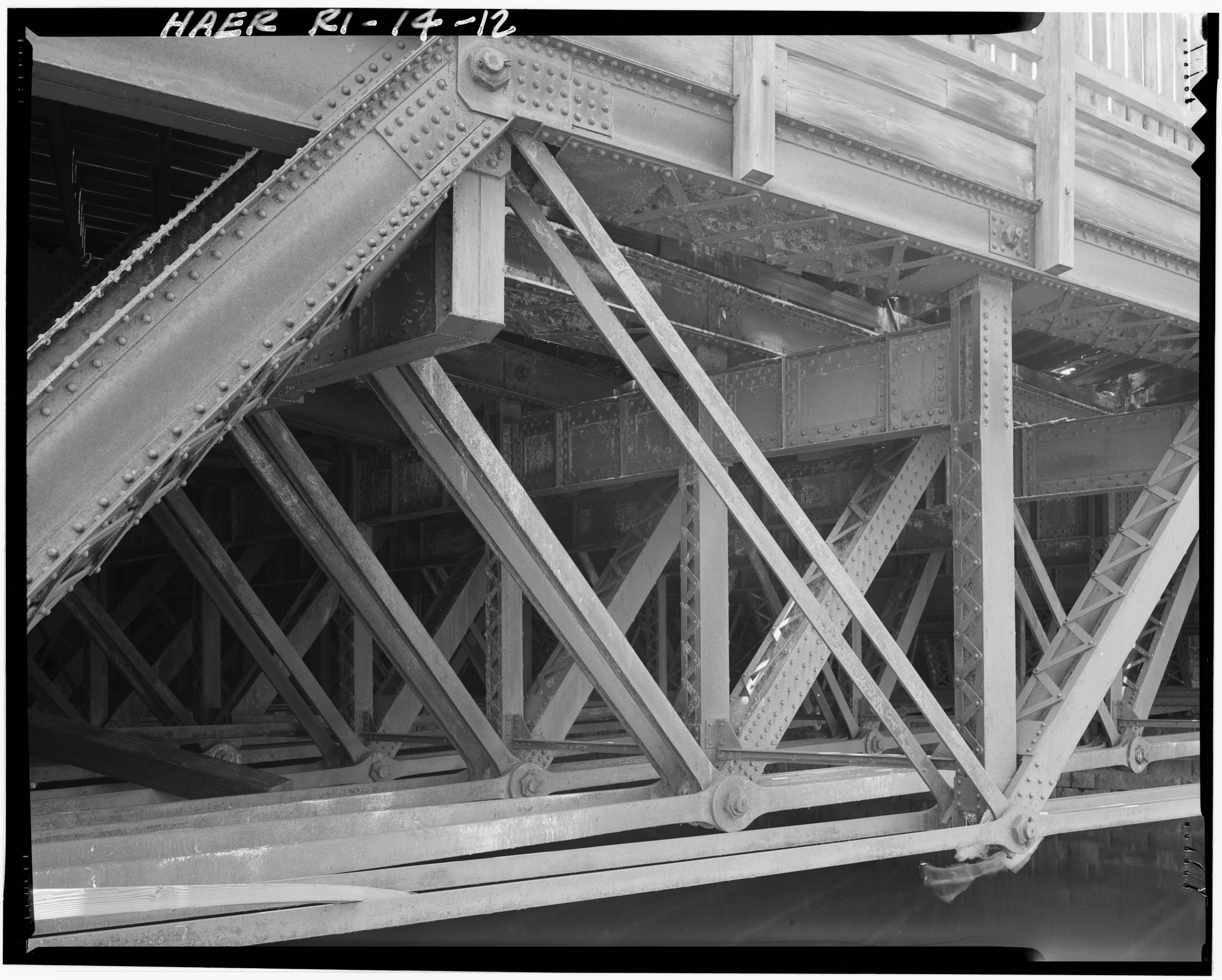
Detailed view of a modified Warren truss with verticals

Warren truss structures, such as bridges, are commonly arranged in isosceles triangles, although sometimes vertical beams are also included for additional strength. Surfaces tessellated by obtuse isosceles triangles can be used to form deployable structures that have two stable states: an unfolded state in which the surface expands to a cylindrical column, and a folded state in which it folds into a more compact prism shape that can be more easily transported. The same tessellation pattern forms the basis of Yoshimura buckling, a pattern formed when cylindrical surfaces are axially compressed, and of the Schwarz lantern, an example used in mathematics to show that the area of a smooth surface cannot always be accurately approximated by polyhedra converging to the surface.

Flag of Guyana

Flag of Saint Lucia

In graphic design and the decorative arts, isosceles triangles have been a frequent design element in cultures around the world from at least the Early Neolithic to modern times. They are a common design element in flags and heraldry, appearing prominently with a vertical base, for instance, in the flag of Guyana, or with a horizontal base in the flag of Saint Lucia, where they form a stylized image of a mountain island.

They also have been used in designs with religious or mystic significance, for instance in the Sri Yantra of Hindu meditational practice.

=== In other areas of mathematics ===
If a cubic equation with real coefficients has three roots that are not all real numbers, then when these roots are plotted in the complex plane as an Argand diagram they form vertices of an isosceles triangle whose axis of symmetry coincides with the horizontal (real) axis. This is because the complex roots are complex conjugates and hence are symmetric about the real axis.

In celestial mechanics, the three-body problem has been studied in the special case that the three bodies form an isosceles triangle, because assuming that the bodies are arranged in this way reduces the number of degrees of freedom of the system without reducing it to the solved Lagrangian point case when the bodies form an equilateral triangle. The first instances of the three-body problem shown to have unbounded oscillations were in the isosceles three-body problem.

== History and fallacies ==
Long before isosceles triangles were studied by the ancient Greek mathematicians, the practitioners of Ancient Egyptian mathematics and Babylonian mathematics knew how to calculate their area. Problems of this type are included in the Moscow Mathematical Papyrus and Rhind Mathematical Papyrus.

The theorem that the base angles of an isosceles triangle are equal appears as Proposition I.5 in Euclid. This result has been called the pons asinorum (the bridge of asses) or the isosceles triangle theorem. Rival explanations for this name include the theory that it is because the diagram used by Euclid in his demonstration of the result resembles a bridge, or because this is the first difficult result in Euclid, and acts to separate those who can understand Euclid's geometry from those who cannot.

A well-known fallacy is the false proof of the statement that all triangles are isosceles, first published by W. W. Rouse Ball in 1892, and later republished in Lewis Carroll's posthumous Lewis Carroll Picture Book. The fallacy is rooted in Euclid's lack of recognition of the concept of betweenness and the resulting ambiguity of inside versus outside of figures.
