= Lemoine hexagon =

Type of cyclic hexagon

The Lemoine hexagon, shown with self-intersecting connectivity, circumscribed by the first Lemoine circle

In geometry, the Lemoine hexagon is a cyclic hexagon with vertices given by the six intersections of the edges of a triangle and the three lines that are parallel to the edges that pass through its symmedian point. There are two definitions of the hexagon that differ based on the order in which the vertices are connected.

== Area and perimeter ==
The Lemoine hexagon can be drawn defined in two ways, first as a simple hexagon with vertices at the intersections as defined before. The second is a self-intersecting hexagon with the lines going through the symmedian point as three of the edges and the other three edges join pairs of adjacent vertices.

For the simple hexagon drawn in a triangle with side lengths $a, b, c$ and area $\Delta$ the perimeter is given by

$$p = \frac{a^3+b^3+c^3+3abc}{a^2+b^2+c^2}$$

and the area by

$$K = \frac{a^4+b^4+c^4+a^2b^2+b^2c^2+c^2a^2}{\left( a^2+b^2+c^2 \right)^2} \Delta$$

For the self intersecting hexagon the perimeter is given by

$$p = \frac{\left( a+b+c\right) \left(ab+bc+ca\right)}{a^2+b^2+c^2}$$

and the area by

$$K = \frac{a^2b^2+b^2c^2+c^2a^2}{\left(a^2+b^2+c^2\right)^2}\Delta$$

== Circumcircle ==
In geometry, five points determine a conic, so arbitrary sets of six points do not generally lie on a conic section, let alone a circle. Nevertheless, the Lemoine hexagon (with either order of connection) is a cyclic polygon, meaning that its vertices all lie on a common circle. The circumcircle of the Lemoine hexagon is known as the first Lemoine circle.
