= Golden triangle (composition) =

Composition technique in visual arts

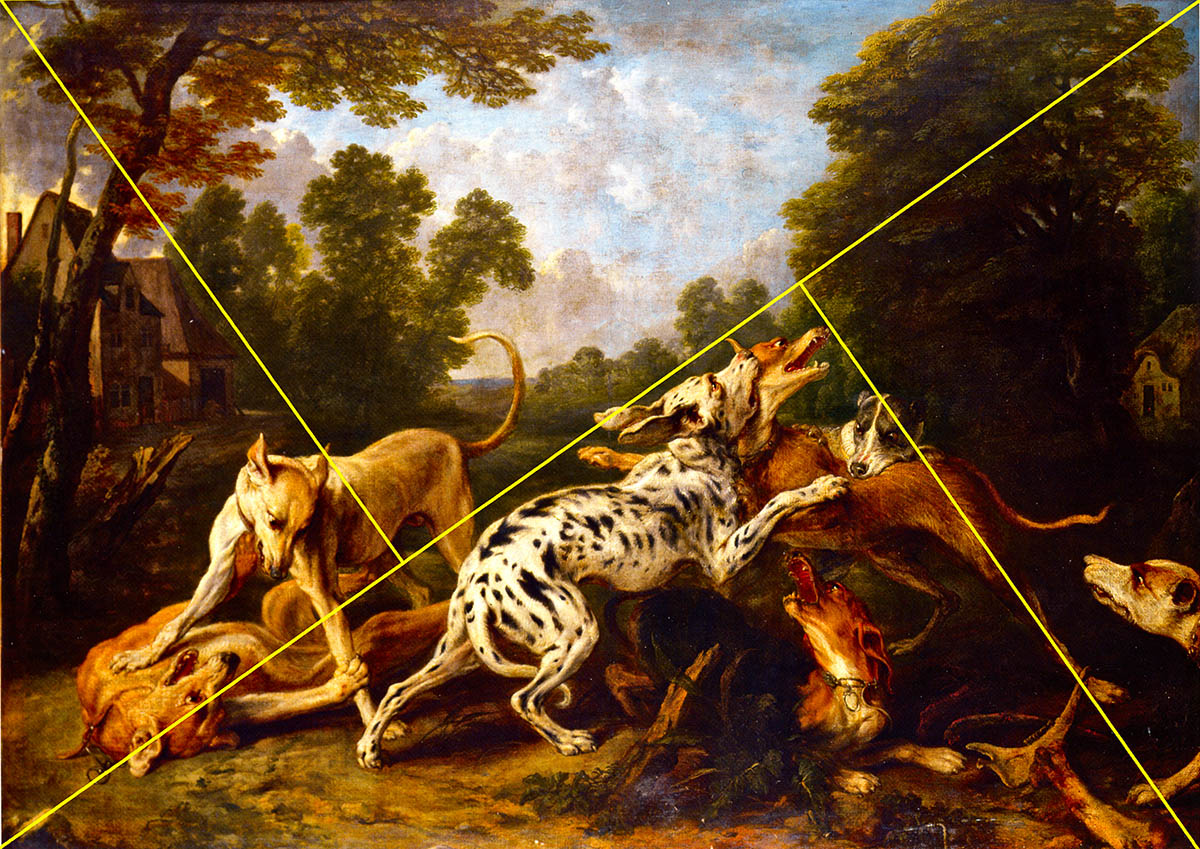
Example of Golden Triangle method on a painting. Compositional elements fall within the triangles.

The golden triangle is a rule of thumb in visual composition of photographs, paintings, and other visual art—especially those that contain elements with diagonal lines. The rule visualizes the frame divided into four triangles of two different sizes, by drawing one diagonal from one corner to another, and then two lines from the other corners, touching the first at 90-degree angles. There are a couple ways to apply this:

1. Filling one of the triangles with the subject

2. Placing the diagonal elements so that they run along two of the lines

== Use in software ==
Photoshop has an option that puts guidelines for the golden triangle in the crop tool (in this case, it is simply called "triangle"). These guidelines can be flipped horizontally.

== See also ==
- Diagonal method – Another method for using diagonal lines in composition.
