= Apex (geometry) =

Peak or top of a geometric figure

In geometry, an apex (pl.: apices) is the vertex which is in some sense the "highest" of the figure to which it belongs. The term is typically used to refer to the vertex opposite from some "base". The word is derived from the Latin for 'summit, peak, tip, top, extreme end'. The term apex may be used in different contexts:

- In an isosceles triangle, the apex is the vertex where the two sides of equal length meet, opposite the unequal third side.

Here the point A is the apex

- In a pyramid or cone, the apex is the vertex at the "top" (opposite the base). In a pyramid, the vertex is the point that is part of all the lateral faces, or where all the lateral edges meet.

The apex and base of a square pyramid
