= Base (geometry) =

Bottom of a geometric figure

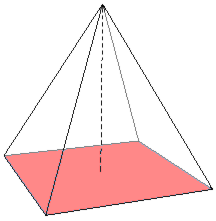
A skeletal pyramid with its base highlighted

In geometry, a base is a side of a polygon or a face of a polyhedron, particularly one oriented perpendicular to the direction in which height is measured, or on what is considered to be the "bottom" of the figure. This term is commonly applied in plane geometry to triangles, parallelograms, trapezoids, and in solid geometry to cylinders, cones, pyramids, parallelepipeds, prisms, and frustums.

The side or point opposite the base is often called the apex or summit of the shape.

== Of a triangle ==
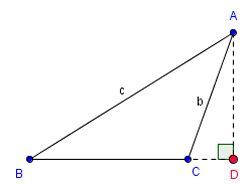
The altitude from A intersects the extended base at D (a point outside the triangle).

In a triangle, any arbitrary side can be considered the base. The two endpoints of the base are called base vertices and the corresponding angles are called base angles. The third vertex opposite the base is called the apex.

The extended base of a triangle (a particular case of an extended side) is the line that contains the base. When the triangle is obtuse and the base is chosen to be one of the sides adjacent to the obtuse angle, then the altitude dropped perpendicularly from the apex to the base intersects the extended base outside of the triangle.

The area of a triangle is its half of the product of the base times the height (length of the altitude). For a triangle $\triangle ABC$ with opposite sides $a, b, c,$ if the three altitudes of the triangle are called $h_a, h_b, h_c,$ the area is:

$$\Delta = \tfrac12 a h_a = \tfrac12 b h_b = \tfrac12 c h_c.$$

Given a fixed base side and a fixed area for a triangle, the locus of apex points is a straight line parallel to the base.

== Of a trapezoid or parallelogram ==
Any of the sides of a parallelogram, or either (but typically the longer) of the parallel sides of a trapezoid can be considered its base. Sometimes the parallel opposite side is also called a base, or sometimes it is called a top, apex, or summit. The other two edges can be called the sides.

== Role in area and volume calculation ==
Bases are commonly used (together with heights) to calculate the areas and volumes of figures. In speaking about these processes, the measure (length or area) of a figure's base is often referred to as its "base."

By this usage, the area of a parallelogram or the volume of a prism or cylinder can be calculated by multiplying its "base" by its height; likewise, the areas of triangles and the volumes of cones and pyramids are fractions of the products of their bases and heights. Some figures have two parallel bases (such as trapezoids and frustums), both of which are used to calculate the extent of the figures.
