= List of things named after Fibonacci =

The Fibonacci numbers are the best known concept named after Leonardo of Pisa, known as Fibonacci. Among others are the following.

Concepts in mathematics and computing

- Brahmagupta–Fibonacci identity
- Fibonacci coding
- Fibonacci cube
- Fibonacci heap
- Fibonacci polynomials
- Fibonacci prime
- Fibonacci pseudoprime
- Fibonacci quasicrystal
- Fibonacci retracement
- Fibonacci search technique
- Fibonacci triangle
- Fibonacci–Sylvester expansion
- Fibonacci word
- Lagged Fibonacci generator
- Negafibonacci
- NegaFibonacci coding
- Pisano period
- Reciprocal Fibonacci constant
- Young–Fibonacci lattice
- Fibonacci Noodles
- Fibonacci Chair

A professional association and a scholarly journal that it publishes

- The Fibonacci Association
- Fibonacci Quarterly

An asteroid

- 6765 Fibonacci

An art rock band

- The Fibonaccis
