= John of Palermo =

John of Palermo (fl. 1221–1240) was a translator of mathematical works from Arabic to Latin who lived in Palermo, Sicily. He worked in the court of Emperor Frederick II.

John had been introduced into the court of Frederick II through the mathematician Domenico Ispano. John is mentioned by Leonardo Fibonacci in his Liber quadratorum (1225) and several problems from Arab texts by Omar Khayyam were posed to Fibonacci. Some court documents mention a Johannes de Panormo who is thought to be the same person. John translated an Arab manuscript, possibly by Ibn al-Haytham, on the parabola into Latin as the De duabus lineis semper approximantibus sibi invicem et nunquam concurrentibus. John as noted as a "notarius" and there are indications that Frederick was to send him to Tunis in 1240.
