= Jerrold B. Tunnell =

American mathematician (1950–2022)

- Born: Jerrold Bates Tunnell; September 16, 1950; Dallas, Texas, U.S.
- Died: April 1, 2022 (aged 71); Texas, U.S.
- Education: Harvey Mudd College; Harvard University
- Known for: Langlands–Tunnell theorem Tunnell's theorem
- Awards: Fellow of the American Mathematical Society (2013)
- Scientific career
- Fields: Mathematics
- Workplaces: Rutgers University
- Thesis: On the Local Langlands Conjecture for GL(2) (1977)
- Doctoral advisor: John Tate

Jerrold Bates Tunnell (September 16, 1950 – April 1, 2022) was a mathematician known for his work in number theory. He was an associate professor of mathematics at Rutgers University.

== Early life and education ==
Tunnell was born on September 16, 1950, in Dallas, Texas.

He graduated from Harvey Mudd College in 1972. He received his PhD in Mathematics from Harvard University in 1977. His thesis, On the Local Langlands Conjecture for GL(2), was advised by John Tate.

== Career ==
After graduation, Tunnell taught at Princeton University and was a member of the Institute for Advanced Study from 1982 to 1983. He joined the mathematics faculty at Rutgers University in 1983, eventually becoming an associate professor of mathematics. He advised 7 PhD students.

== Research ==
In 1981, Tunnell generalized Langlands' work on the Artin conjecture, establishing a special case known as the Langlands–Tunnell theorem that later became a key component in the proof of Fermat's Last Theorem.

He proved Tunnell's theorem in 1983, which gives a partial unconditional solution to the congruent number problem and a complete solution conditional on the Birch and Swinnerton-Dyer conjecture.

== Awards and honors ==
In 2013, Tunnell was elected in the inaugural class of Fellows of the American Mathematical Society.

== Personal life ==
Starting in 2004, Tunnell made cross-country cycling trips from Highland Park, New Jersey, to Syracuse, New York, in every U.S. election cycle.

Tunnell died on April 1, 2022, in rural Texas. He was hit by a truck while riding his bicycle from St. Augustine, Florida, to his 50th class reunion at Harvey Mudd College in Claremont, California.
