= Congruum =

Spacing between equally-spaced square numbers

The two right triangles with leg and hypotenuse (7,13) and (13,17) have equal third sides of length $\sqrt{120}$. The square of this side, 120, is a congruum: it is the difference between consecutive values in the arithmetic progression of squares 7^{2}, 13^{2}, 17^{2}. Equivalently, the two annuli between the three yellow circles have equal areas, π times the congruum.

In number theory, a congruum (plural congrua) is the difference between successive square numbers in an arithmetic progression of three squares. The congruum problem is the problem of finding squares in arithmetic progression and their associated congrua. It can be formalized as a Diophantine equation.

Fibonacci solved the congruum problem by finding a parameterized formula for generating all congrua, together with their associated arithmetic progressions. According to this formula, each congruum is four times the area of a Pythagorean triangle, a right triangle whose sides are integers. Congrua are also closely connected with congruent numbers, the areas of right triangles whose sides are rational numbers. Every congruum is a congruent number, and every congruent number is a congruum multiplied by the square of a rational number.

Fibonacci claimed without proof that it is impossible for a congruum to be a square number. This was later proven by Pierre de Fermat as Fermat's right triangle theorem.

== Definitions ==
A congruum is defined to be any number that can form the difference between successive square numbers in an arithmetic progression of three squares. That is, if $x^2$, $y^2$, and $z^2$ (for integers $x$, $y$, and $z$) are three square numbers that are equally spaced apart from each other, then the spacing between them, $y^2-x^2=z^2-y^2$, is called a congruum.

The congruum problem is the problem of finding squares in arithmetic progression and their associated congrua. It can be formalized as a Diophantine equation: find integers $x$, $y$, and $z$ such that $y^2 - x^2 = z^2 - y^2.$ When this equation is satisfied, both sides of the equation equal the congruum.

== Examples ==
As an example, the number 96 is a congruum because it is the difference between adjacent squares in the sequence 4, 100, and 196 (the squares of 2, 10, and 14 respectively).

The first few congrua are:

24, 96, 120, 216, 240, 336, 384, 480, 600, 720 … (sequence A256418 in the OEIS).

== History ==
The congruum problem was originally studied and solved by Islamic mathematicians of the 10th century, mainly Abū Ja'far al-Khāzin.

In 1225, the congruum problem was part of a mathematical tournament held by Frederick II, Holy Roman Emperor, and answered correctly at that time by Fibonacci, who recorded his work on this problem in his Book of Squares, without crediting al-Khāzin.

Fibonacci was already aware that it is impossible for a congruum to itself be a square, but did not give a satisfactory proof of this fact. Geometrically, this means that it is not possible for the pair of legs of a Pythagorean triangle to be the leg and hypotenuse of another Pythagorean triangle. A proof was eventually given by Pierre de Fermat, and the result is now known as Fermat's right triangle theorem. Fermat also conjectured, and Leonhard Euler proved, that there is no sequence of four squares in arithmetic progression.

== Parameterized solution ==
The congruum problem may be solved by choosing two distinct positive integers $m$ and $n$ (with $m>n$); then the number $4mn(m^2-n^2)$ is a congruum. The middle square of the associated arithmetic progression of squares is $(m^2+n^2)^2$, and the other two squares may be found by adding or subtracting the congruum. Additionally, multiplying a congruum by a square number produces another congruum, whose progression of squares is multiplied by the same factor. All solutions arise in one of these two ways. For instance, the congruum 96 can be constructed by these formulas with $m=3$ and $n=1$, while the congruum 216 is obtained by multiplying the smaller congruum 24 by the square number 9.

An equivalent formulation of this solution, given by Bernard Frénicle de Bessy, is that for the three squares in arithmetic progression $x^2$, $y^2$, and $z^2$, the middle number $y$ is the hypotenuse of a Pythagorean triangle and the other two numbers $x$ and $z$ are the difference and sum respectively of the triangle's two legs. The congruum itself is four times the area of the same Pythagorean triangle. The example of an arithmetic progression with the congruum 96 can be obtained in this way from a right triangle with side and hypotenuse lengths 6, 8, and 10.

== Relation to congruent numbers ==
A congruent number is defined as the area of a right triangle with rational sides. Because every congruum can be obtained (using the parameterized solution) as the area of a Pythagorean triangle, it follows that every congruum is congruent. Every congruent number is a congruum multiplied by the square of a rational number. However, testing whether a number is a congruum is much easier than testing whether a number is congruent. For the congruum problem, the parameterized solution reduces this testing problem to checking a finite set of parameter values, as the two parameters $m$ and $n$ must both divide the given number. In contrast, for the congruent number problem, a finite testing procedure is known only conjecturally, via Tunnell's theorem, under the assumption that the Birch and Swinnerton-Dyer conjecture is true.

== See also ==
- Fermat's right triangle theorem
- Automedian triangle, a triangle for which the squares on the three sides form an arithmetic progression
- Spiral of Theodorus, formed by right triangles whose (non-integer) sides, when squared, form an infinite arithmetic progression
