= Congruent number =

Area of a right triangle with rational-numbered sides

Right triangle with the area 6, a congruent number.

In number theory, a congruent number is a positive integer that is the area of a right triangle with three rational number sides. A more general definition includes all positive rational numbers with this property.

The sequence of (integer) congruent numbers starts with

5, 6, 7, 13, 14, 15, 20, 21, 22, 23, 24, 28, 29, 30, 31, 34, 37, 38, 39, 41, 45, 46, 47, 52, 53, 54, 55, 56, 60, 61, 62, 63, 65, 69, 70, 71, 77, 78, 79, 80, 84, 85, 86, 87, 88, 92, 93, 94, 95, 96, 101, 102, 103, 109, 110, 111, 112, 116, 117, 118, 119, 120, ... (sequence A003273 in the OEIS)

Congruent number table: n ≤ 120

Congruent number table: n ≤ 120 —: non-Congruent number C: square-free Congruent number S: Congruent number with square factor
n	1	2	3	4	5	6	7	8
	—	—	—	—	C	C	C	—
n	9	10	11	12	13	14	15	16
	—	—	—	—	C	C	C	—
n	17	18	19	20	21	22	23	24
	—	—	—	S	C	C	C	S
n	25	26	27	28	29	30	31	32
	—	—	—	S	C	C	C	—
n	33	34	35	36	37	38	39	40
	—	C	—	—	C	C	C	—
n	41	42	43	44	45	46	47	48
	C	—	—	—	S	C	C	—
n	49	50	51	52	53	54	55	56
	—	—	—	S	C	S	C	S
n	57	58	59	60	61	62	63	64
	—	—	—	S	C	C	S	—
n	65	66	67	68	69	70	71	72
	C	—	—	—	C	C	C	—
n	73	74	75	76	77	78	79	80
	—	—	—	—	C	C	C	S
n	81	82	83	84	85	86	87	88
	—	—	—	S	C	C	C	S
n	89	90	91	92	93	94	95	96
	—	—	—	S	C	C	C	S
n	97	98	99	100	101	102	103	104
	—	—	—	—	C	C	C	—
n	105	106	107	108	109	110	111	112
	—	—	—	—	C	C	C	S
n	113	114	115	116	117	118	119	120
	—	—	—	S	S	C	C	S

For example, 5 is a congruent number because it is the area of a (20/3, 3/2, 41/6) triangle. Similarly, 6 is a congruent number because it is the area of a (3,4,5) triangle. 3 and 4 are not congruent numbers. The triangle sides demonstrating a number is congruent can have very large numerators and denominators, for example 263 is the area of a triangle whose two shortest sides are 16277526249841969031325182370950195/2303229894605810399672144140263708 and 4606459789211620799344288280527416/61891734790273646506939856923765.

If q is a congruent number then s^{2}q is also a congruent number for any natural number s (just by multiplying each side of the triangle by s), and vice versa. This leads to the observation that whether a nonzero rational number q is a congruent number depends only on its residue in the group

$$\mathbb{Q}^{*}/\mathbb{Q}^{*2},$$

where $\mathbb{Q}^{*}$ is the set of nonzero rational numbers.

Every residue class in this group contains exactly one square-free integer, and it is common, therefore, only to consider square-free positive integers when speaking about congruent numbers.

== History ==
While solutions of quadratic equations and construction of Pythagorean triples were known in ancient times and were transmitted through Greek and Indian Mathematics, congruent numbers were first tabulated in Arabic manuscripts by the 10th century—including a formulation of the congruent number problem by Persian mathematician Al-Khazin—with 5 and 6 among the earliest known examples. Some scholars speculate an Indian origin for the congruent number problem, mathematician Frans Oort finds such an origin unclear since it is not evidenced in standard literature even though related quadratic equations were studied in medieval India. According to historians of mathematics Norbert Schappacher and Roshdi Rashed, 3rd century Greek mathematician Diophantus didn't formulate the problem of congruent numbers. In the 13th century, Fibonacci identified 7 as a congruent number and noted that 1 is not. The first accepted proof of the non-congruence of 1 was later given by Pierre de Fermat, who also proved that 2 and 3 are not congruent numbers.

== Congruent number problem ==
The question of determining whether a given rational number is a congruent number is called the congruent number problem. As of 2019, this problem has not been brought to a successful resolution. Tunnell's theorem provides an easily testable criterion for determining whether a number is congruent; but his result relies on the Birch and Swinnerton-Dyer conjecture, which is still unproven.

Fermat's right triangle theorem, named after Pierre de Fermat, states that no square number can be a congruent number. However, in the form that every congruum (the difference between consecutive elements in an arithmetic progression of three squares) is non-square, it was already known (without proof) to Fibonacci. Every congruum is a congruent number, and every congruent number is a product of a congruum and the square of a rational number. However, determining whether a number is a congruum is much easier than determining whether it is congruent, because there is a parameterized formula for congrua for which only finitely many parameter values need to be tested.

== Solutions ==
n is a congruent number if and only if the system

$x^2 - n y^2 = u^2$, $x^2 + n y^2 = v^2$

has a solution where $x, y, u$, and $v$ are integers.

Given a solution, the three numbers $u^2$, $x^2$, and $v^2$ will be in an arithmetic progression with common difference $n y^2$.

Furthermore, if there is one solution (where the right-hand sides are squares), then there are infinitely many: given any solution $(x, y)$, another solution $(x', y')$ can be computed from

$$x' = (x u)^2 + n (y v)^2,$$
$$y' = 2 x y u v.$$

For example, with $n = 6$, the equations are:

$$x^2 - 6 y^2 = u^2,$$
$$x^2 + 6 y^2 = v^2.$$

One solution is $x = 5, y = 2$ (so that $u = 1, v = 7$). Another solution is

$$x' = (5 \cdot 1)^2 + 6 (2 \cdot 7)^2 = 1201,$$
$$y' = 2 \cdot 5 \cdot 2 \cdot 1  \cdot 7 = 140.$$

With this new $x'$ and $y'$, the new right-hand sides are still both squares:

$$u'^2 = 1201^2 - 6 \cdot 140^2 = 1324801 = 1151^2,$$
$$v'^2 = 1201^2 + 6 \cdot 140^2 = 1560001 = 1249^2.$$

Using $x'=1201, y'=140, u', v'$ as above gives

$$u''=1,727,438,169,601$$
$$v''=2,405,943,600,001$$

Given $x, y, u$, and $v$, one can obtain $a, b$, and $c$ such that

$a^2 + b^2 = c^2$, and $\frac{ab}{2} = n$

from

$$a = \frac{v - u}{y}, \quad b = \frac{v + u}{y}, \quad c = \frac{2x}{y}.$$

Then $a, b$ and $c$ are the legs and hypotenuse of a right triangle with area $n$.

The above values $(x, y, u, v) = (5, 2, 1, 7)$ produce $(a, b, c) = (3, 4, 5)$. The values $(1201, 140, 1151, 1249)$ give $(a, b, c) = (7/10, 120/7, 1201/70)$. Both of these right triangles have area $n = 6$.

== Relation to elliptic curves ==
According to Leonard Eugene Dickson's compilation of historical texts, a tenth-century Arabic manuscript by Mohammed Ben Alhocain states that the core goal of the theory of rational right triangles is to identify a square that, when increased or decreased by a given number, results in another square. In modern terminology, this task translates to locating a rational point of infinite order on the elliptic curve $my^2 = x^3 - x$.

The question of whether a given number is congruent turns out to be equivalent to the condition that a certain elliptic curve has positive rank. An alternative approach to the idea is presented below (as can essentially also be found in the introduction to Tunnell's paper).

Fix nonzero n. Suppose a, b, c are numbers (not necessarily positive or rational) which satisfy the following two equations:

$$\begin{align}
a^2 + b^2 &= c^2, \\
\tfrac{1}{2}ab &= n.
\end{align}$$

Then set x = n(a + c)/b and y = 2n^{2}(a + c)/b^{2}. A calculation shows

$$y^2 = x^3 - n^2 x$$

and y is not 0 (if y = 0 then a = −c, so b = 0, but (1/2)ab = n is nonzero, a contradiction).

Conversely, if x and y are numbers which satisfy the above equation and y is not 0, set a = (x^{2} − n^{2})/y, b = 2nx/y, and c = (x^{2} + n^{2})/y. A calculation shows these three numbers satisfy the two equations for a, b, and c above.

These two correspondences between (a,b,c) and (x,y) are inverses of each other, so we have a one-to-one correspondence between any solution of the two equations in a, b, and c and any solution of the equation in x and y with y nonzero. In particular, from the formulas in the two correspondences, for rational n we see that a, b, and c are rational if and only if the corresponding x and y are rational, and vice versa. (We also have that a, b, and c are all positive if and only if x and y are all positive; from the equation y^{2} = x^{3} − xn^{2} = x(x^{2} − n^{2}) we see that if x and y are positive then x^{2} − n^{2} must be positive, so the formula for a above is positive.)

Thus a positive rational number n is congruent if and only if the equation y^{2} = x^{3} − n^{2}x has a rational point with y not equal to 0. It can be shown (as an application of Dirichlet's theorem on primes in arithmetic progression) that the only torsion points on this elliptic curve are those with y equal to 0, hence the existence of a rational point with y nonzero is equivalent to saying the elliptic curve has positive rank.

Another approach to solving is to start with integer value of n denoted as N and solve

$$N^2 = ed^2 + e^2$$

where

$$\begin{align}
c &= n^2/e + e\\
a &= 2n\\
b &= n^2/e - e
\end{align}$$

== Current progress ==
For example, it is known that for a prime number p, the following holds:

- if p ≡ 3 (mod 8), then p is not a congruent number, but 2p is a congruent number.
- if p ≡ 5 (mod 8), then p is a congruent number.
- if p ≡ 7 (mod 8), then p and 2p are congruent numbers.

It is also known that in each of the congruence classes 5, 6, 7 (mod 8), for any given k there are infinitely many square-free congruent numbers with k odd prime factors.
