= Langlands–Tunnell theorem =

Basic Introduction

In number theory, the Langlands–Tunnell theorem is a theorem due to Robert Langlands and Jerrold Tunnell that played a fundamental role in Wiles's proof of Fermat's last theorem. The theorem allows certain symmetries of algebraic number fields to be detected by the Fourier coefficients of modular forms. More specifically, it gives the modularity of certain two-dimensional Galois representations. In one common form, it states that every continuous, irreducible, odd complex representation
$$\rho:\operatorname{Gal}(\overline{\mathbb Q}/\mathbb Q)\to \operatorname{GL}_2(\mathbb C)$$
whose projective image is solvable is associated with a modular form of weight one.

== Motivation ==
=== Dihedral example ===
In this context, modularity means that a Galois representation and a modular form give the same arithmetic data at almost all primes. A two-dimensional representation $\rho:G_{\mathbb Q}\to \operatorname{GL}_2(\mathbb C)$ assigns to almost every prime $p$ a Frobenius trace $\operatorname{tr}\rho(\operatorname{Frob}_p)$. A normalized Hecke eigenform $f(q)=\sum a_nq^n$ assigns to the same prime its Fourier coefficient $a_p$. The representation $\rho$ is called modular if there is such an eigenform $f$ for which
$$a_p=\operatorname{tr}\rho(\operatorname{Frob}_p)$$
for all but finitely many primes $p$, together with the corresponding determinant character. For the Langlands–Tunnell theorem the modular forms are weight-one forms, and the associated Galois representations have finite image. The dihedral case is the easiest case of the theorem because the Galois representation is induced from a character of a quadratic field, and the modular form is an explicit theta series.

Let
$$K=\mathbb Q(i),\qquad \mathcal O_K=\mathbb Z[i].$$
The rational prime $13$ splits in $\mathbb Z[i]$ as
$$13=(3+2i)(3-2i).$$
Let $\pi=3+2i$. Reducing modulo $\pi$ identifies
$$\mathbb Z[i]/(\pi)\cong \mathbb F_{13},$$
with
$$i\equiv 5\pmod{\pi}.$$
Now define a cubic character
$$\chi:\mathbb F_{13}^{\times}\to \{1,\zeta,\zeta^2\},
\qquad \zeta=e^{2\pi i/3},$$
by taking $2$ as a generator of $\mathbb F_{13}^{\times}$ and setting
$$\chi(2)=\zeta.$$
Equivalently,
$$\chi(r)=
\begin{cases}
1,&r\in\{1,5,8,12\},\\
\zeta,&r\in\{2,3,10,11\},\\
\zeta^2,&r\in\{4,6,7,9\}.
\end{cases}$$
This character is trivial on the images of the four units $\{\pm1,\pm i\}$, since these reduce to $\{1,12,5,8\}$ modulo $\pi$. Therefore it defines a character of ideals prime to $\pi$ by
$$\psi((a+bi))=\chi(a+5b\bmod 13).$$
The condition that $\chi$ be trivial on units is what makes this formula independent of the choice of generator of the ideal $(a+bi)$.

The associated two-dimensional Galois representation is
$$\rho_\psi=\operatorname{Ind}_{G_K}^{G_{\mathbb Q}}\psi.$$
It is irreducible because $\psi$ is not fixed by complex conjugation; conjugation changes the prime $3+2i$ to $3-2i$. Its projective image is dihedral.

The corresponding modular form is the character-weighted theta series
$$f_\psi(\tau)=\sum_{\mathfrak a}\psi(\mathfrak a)q^{N\mathfrak a},
\qquad q=e^{2\pi i\tau},$$
where the sum is over integral ideals of $\mathbb Z[i]$ prime to $\pi$. Since $\mathbb Z[i]$ has class number one, this can be written explicitly as a sum over integers:
$$f_\psi(\tau)=\frac14\sum_{a,b\in\mathbb Z}\chi(a+5b\bmod 13)\,q^{a^2+b^2},$$
where one extends $\chi$ by setting $\chi(0)=0$. The factor $1/4$ accounts for the four units of $\mathbb Z[i]$.

Thus the coefficients are explicit weighted counts of representations of integers as sums of two squares:
$$a_n(f_\psi)=\frac14\sum_{a,b\in\mathbb Z, a^2+b^2=n}\chi(a+5b\bmod 13).$$

For primes $p\neq 2,13$, this gives the expected dihedral trace formula. If
$$p\equiv 3\pmod 4,$$
then $p$ is inert in $\mathbb Q(i)$, and
$$a_p(f_\psi)=0.$$
If
$$p\equiv 1\pmod 4$$
and $p=a^2+b^2$, then
$$a_p(f_\psi)=\chi(a+5b\bmod 13)+\chi(a-5b\bmod 13).$$
This is exactly
$$\operatorname{tr}\rho_\psi(\operatorname{Frob}_p).$$
So in this example the modularity statement is visible directly in the coefficients of a theta series.

=== Overview ===
The Langlands–Tunnell theorem is a bridge between two ways of attaching arithmetic data to prime numbers. On one side, a two-dimensional Galois representation
$$\rho:G_{\mathbb Q}\to \operatorname{GL}_2(\mathbb C)$$
assigns to almost every prime $p$ a matrix $\rho(\operatorname{Frob}_p)$, where $\operatorname{Frob}_p$ is a Frobenius element at $p$. The trace
$$\operatorname{tr}\rho(\operatorname{Frob}_p)$$
is then a number attached to the prime $p$.

On the other side, a normalized modular eigenform
$$f(q)=\sum_{n\geq 1}a_nq^n$$
has Fourier coefficients $a_p$ indexed by primes. To say that $\rho$ is modular means, roughly, that these two prime-indexed sequences agree:
$$a_p=\operatorname{tr}\rho(\operatorname{Frob}_p)$$
for all but finitely many primes $p$.

The Langlands–Tunnell theorem proves this modularity statement for odd irreducible two-dimensional complex Galois representations whose projective image is solvable. In less technical terms, it says that a large class of two-dimensional symmetries of algebraic number fields can be read off from the Fourier coefficients of weight-one modular forms.

One source of two-dimensional Galois representations comes from elliptic curves. If $E/\mathbb Q$ is an elliptic curve, then the action of $G_{\mathbb Q}$ on the $3$-torsion points $E[3]$ gives a representation
$$\bar\rho_{E,3}:G_{\mathbb Q}\to \operatorname{GL}_2(\mathbb F_3).$$
For primes $p$ of good reduction with $p\neq 3$, its trace is congruent modulo $3$ to
$$a_p(E)=p+1-\#E(\mathbb F_p).$$
Since $\operatorname{GL}_2(\mathbb F_3)$ is solvable, the mod $3$ consequence of the Langlands–Tunnell theorem implies, under the usual irreducibility and oddness hypotheses, that $\bar\rho_{E,3}$ is modular. This residual modularity was one of the starting inputs in Wiles's proof of the modularity of semistable elliptic curves, and hence of Fermat's Last Theorem.

In the dihedral case, the relevant modular forms are theta series attached to characters of quadratic fields. Thus modularity can be checked directly from the coefficients of these theta series. The Langlands--Tunnell theorem goes beyond this elementary theta-series case by proving modularity for the tetrahedral and octahedral solvable cases as well, corresponding to projective images $A_4$ and $S_4$. The icosahedral case, corresponding to projective image $A_5$, is not covered by Langlands--Tunnell because $A_5$ is not solvable. Over the rational field, this case was settled by Serre's modularity conjecture, proved Khare and Wintenberger together with work of Kisin. With this case covered, the strong Artin conjecture is known for all odd irreducible two-dimensional complex representations of $G_{\mathbb Q}$, including the icosahedral case.

== Statement ==
Let $G_{\mathbb Q}=\operatorname{Gal}(\overline{\mathbb Q}/\mathbb Q)$ be the absolute Galois group of the rational numbers. A two-dimensional complex representation
$$\rho:G_{\mathbb Q}\to \operatorname{GL}_2(\mathbb C)$$
is called odd if, for a complex conjugation element $c\in G_{\mathbb Q}$,
$$\det(\rho(c))=-1.$$

One form of the theorem states that if $\rho$ is continuous, irreducible, and odd, and if the image of the associated projective representation
$$\overline{\rho}:G_{\mathbb Q}\to \operatorname{PGL}_2(\mathbb C)$$
is solvable, then $\rho$ is modular. That is, there is a normalized cuspidal Hecke eigenform $f$ of weight one such that, for all but finitely many primes $p$,
$$a_p(f)=\operatorname{tr}\rho(\operatorname{Frob}_p),$$
where $a_p(f)$ is the $p$-th Fourier coefficient of $f$ and $\operatorname{Frob}_p$ is a Frobenius element at $p$.

Equivalently, the Artin $L$-function $L(s,\rho)$ agrees with the $L$-function of a weight-one modular form. In particular, the theorem proves Artin's conjecture for such representations.

== See also ==
- Langlands program
- Modularity theorem
- Taniyama–Shimura conjecture
