= Odd greedy expansion =

Unsolved problem in mathematics:
Does every rational number with an odd denominator have an odd greedy expansion?
(more unsolved problems in mathematics)

In number theory, the odd greedy expansion problem asks whether a greedy algorithm for finding Egyptian fractions with odd denominators always succeeds. It is an open problem.

== Description ==
An Egyptian fraction represents a given rational number as a sum of distinct unit fractions. If a rational number $x/y$ is a sum of unit fractions with odd denominators,

$$\frac{x}{y} = \sum\frac{1}{2a_i+1},$$

then $y$ must be odd. Conversely, every fraction $x/y$ with $y$ odd can be represented as a sum of distinct odd unit fractions. One method of finding such a representation replaces $x/y$ by $Ax/Ay$ where $A=35\cdot 3^i$ for a sufficiently large $i$, and then expands $Ax$ as a sum of distinct divisors of $Ay$.

However, a simpler greedy algorithm has successfully found Egyptian fractions in which all denominators are odd for all instances $x/y$ (with odd $y$) on which it has been tested: let $u$ be the least odd number that is greater than or equal to $y/x$, include the fraction $1/u$ in the expansion, and continue in the same way (avoiding repeated uses of the same unit fraction) with the remaining fraction $x/y-1/u$. This method is called the odd greedy algorithm and the expansions it creates are called odd greedy expansions.

Stein, Selfridge, Graham, and others have posed the open problem of whether the odd greedy algorithm terminates with a finite expansion for every $x/y$ with $y$ odd.

== Example ==
Let $x/y$ = 4/23.

23/4 = 5 3/4; the next larger odd number is 7. So the first step expands

4/23 = 1/7 + 5/161.

161/5 = 32 1/5; the next larger odd number is 33. So the next step expands

4/23 = 1/7 + 1/33 + 4/5313.

5313/4 = 1328 1/4; the next larger odd number is 1329. So the third step expands

4/23 = 1/7 + 1/33 + 1/1329 + 1/2353659.

Since the final term in this expansion is a unit fraction, the process terminates with this expansion as its result.

== Fractions with long expansions ==
It is possible for the odd greedy algorithm to produce expansions that are shorter than the usual greedy expansion, with smaller denominators. For instance, $\frac{8}{77}=\frac{1}{10}+\frac{1}{257}+\frac{1}{197890}=\frac{1}{11}+\frac{1}{77},$ where the left expansion is the greedy expansion and the right expansion is the odd greedy expansion. However, the odd greedy expansion is more typically long, with large denominators. For instance, as Wagon discovered, the odd greedy expansion for 3/179 has 19 terms, the largest of which is approximately 1.415×10^{439491}. Curiously, the numerators of the fractions to be expanded in each step of the algorithm form a sequence of consecutive integers:

3, 4, 5, 6, 7, 8, 9, 10, 11, 12, 13, 14, 15, 16, 17, 2, 3, 4, 1.

A similar phenomenon occurs with other numbers, such as 5/5809 (an example found independently by K. S. Brown and David Bailey) which has a 27-term expansion. Although the denominators of this expansion are difficult to compute due to their enormous size, the numerator sequence may be found relatively efficiently using modular arithmetic. Nowakowski (1999) describes several additional examples of this type found by Broadhurst, and notes that K. S. Brown has described methods for finding fractions with arbitrarily long expansions.

== On even denominators ==
The odd greedy algorithm cannot terminate when given a fraction with an even denominator, because these fractions do not have finite representations with odd denominators. Therefore, in this case, it produces an infinite series expansion of its input. For instance Sylvester's sequence can be viewed as generated by the odd greedy expansion of 1/2.
