= Fibonacci numbers in popular culture =

The Fibonacci numbers are a sequence of integers, typically starting with 0, 1 and continuing 1, 2, 3, 5, 8, 13, ..., each new number being the sum of the previous two. The Fibonacci numbers, often presented in conjunction with the golden ratio, are a popular theme in culture. They have been mentioned in novels, films, television shows, and songs. The numbers have also been used in the creation of music, visual art, and architecture.

== Architecture ==
The sequence has been used in the design of a building, the Core, at the Eden Project, near St Austell, Cornwall, England.

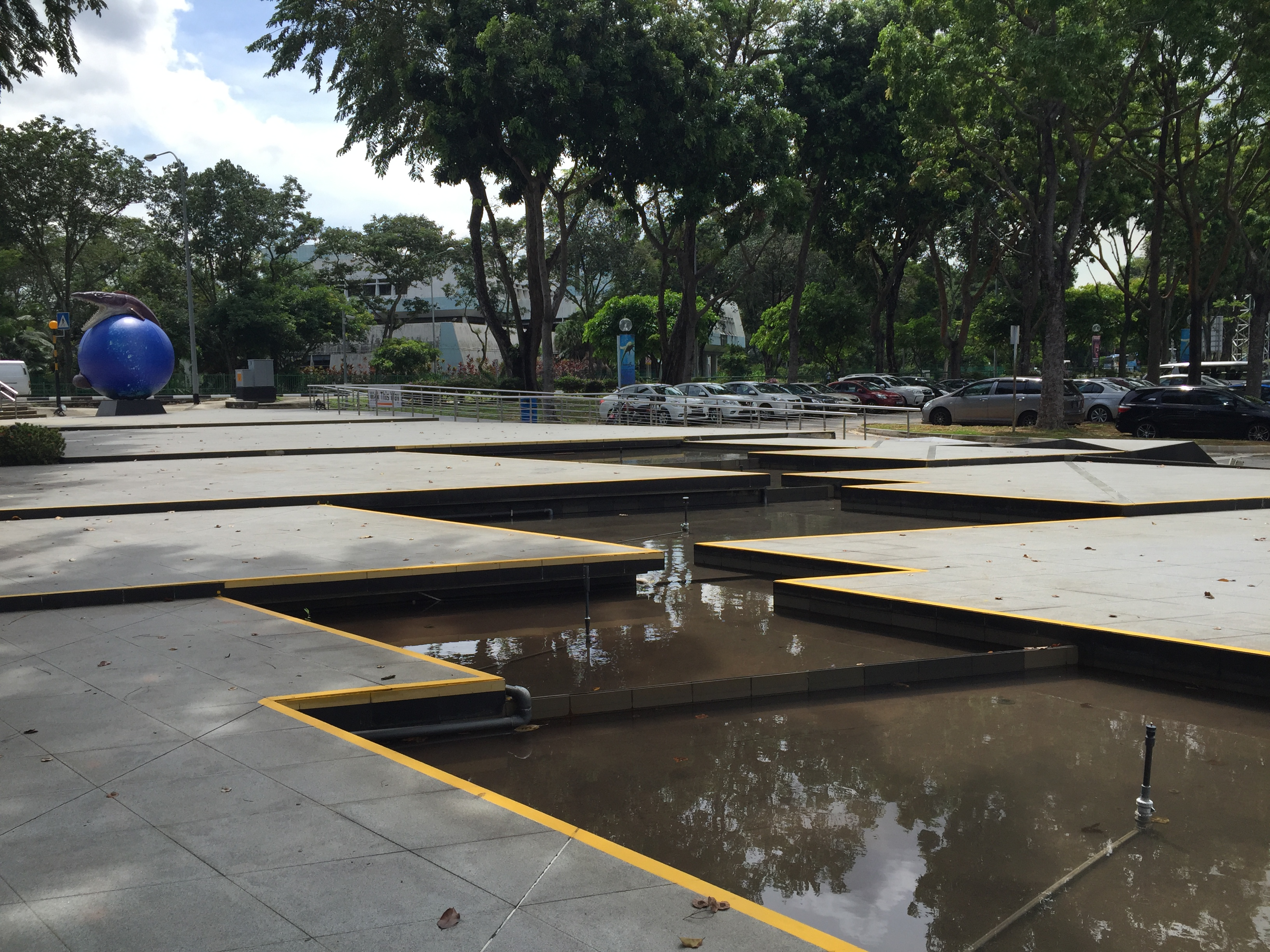
The Fibonacci Terrace at the Science Centre Singapore. The tiles making up the terrace are arranged to form shapes with sides in proportion to Fibonacci number.

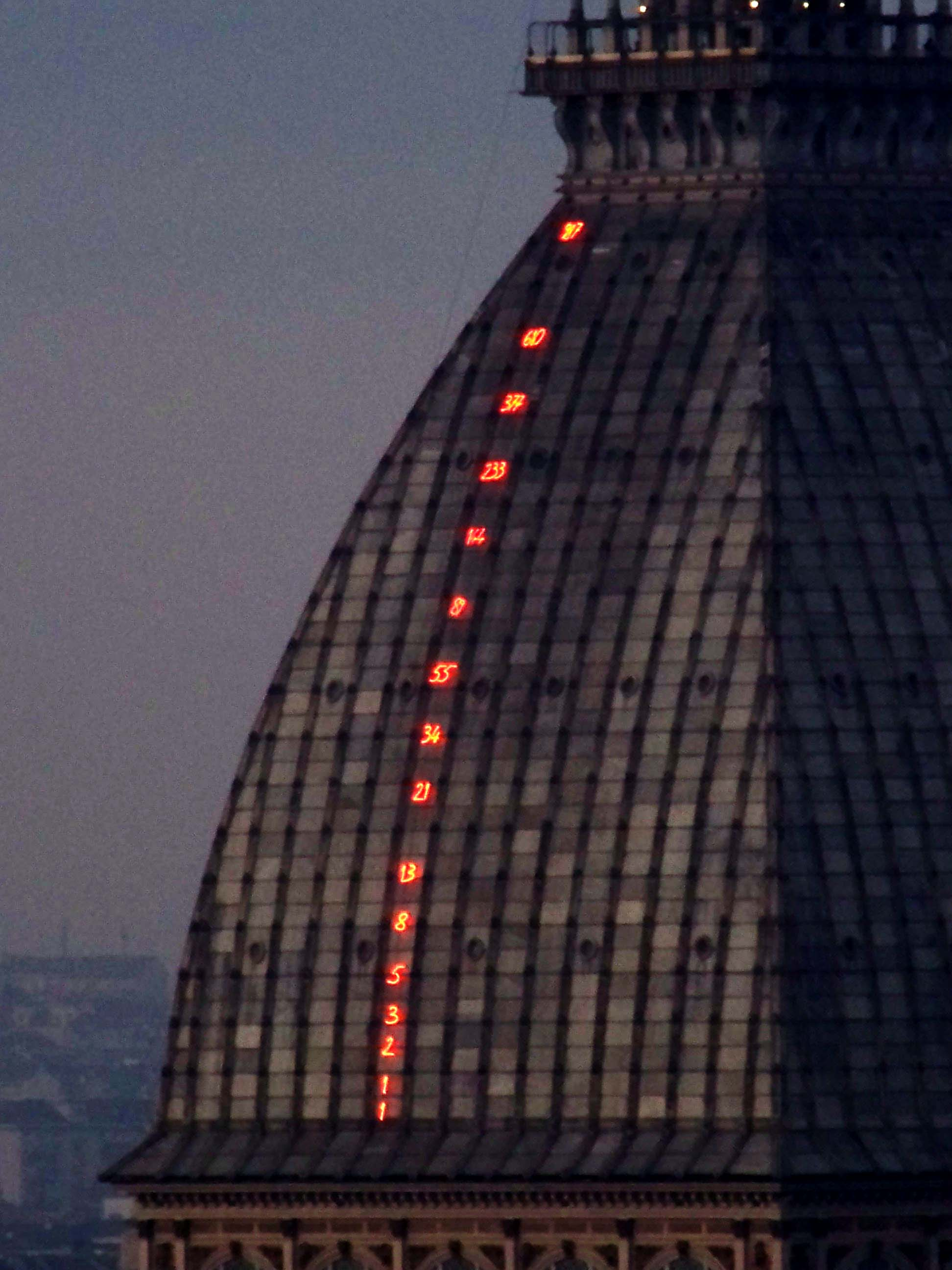
Fibonacci numbers at the Mole Antonelliana in Turin.

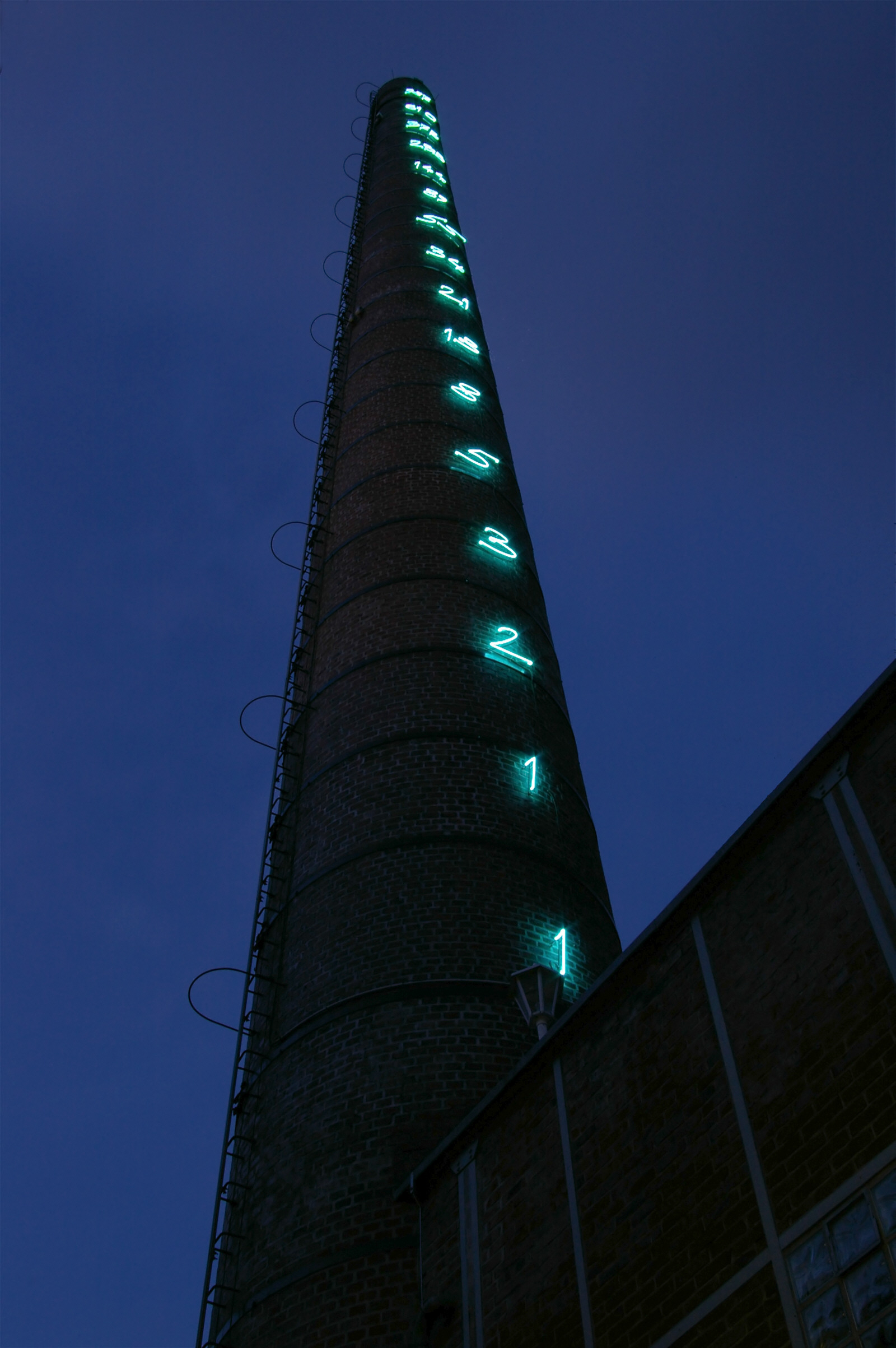
The Fibonacci numbers at the Lindenbrauerei in Unna created by Mario Merz.

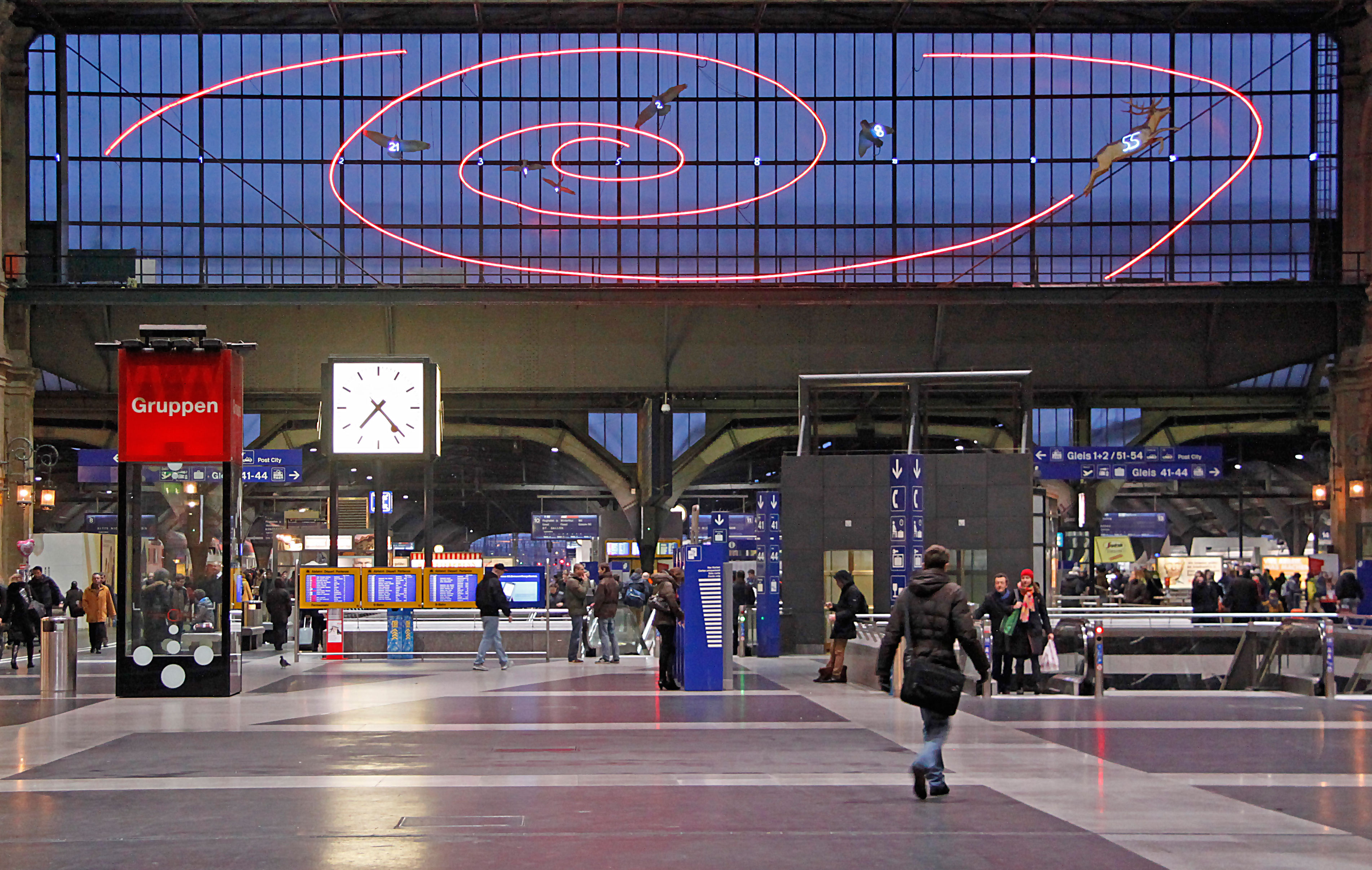
Fibonacci numbers in the Zürich Hauptbahnhof.

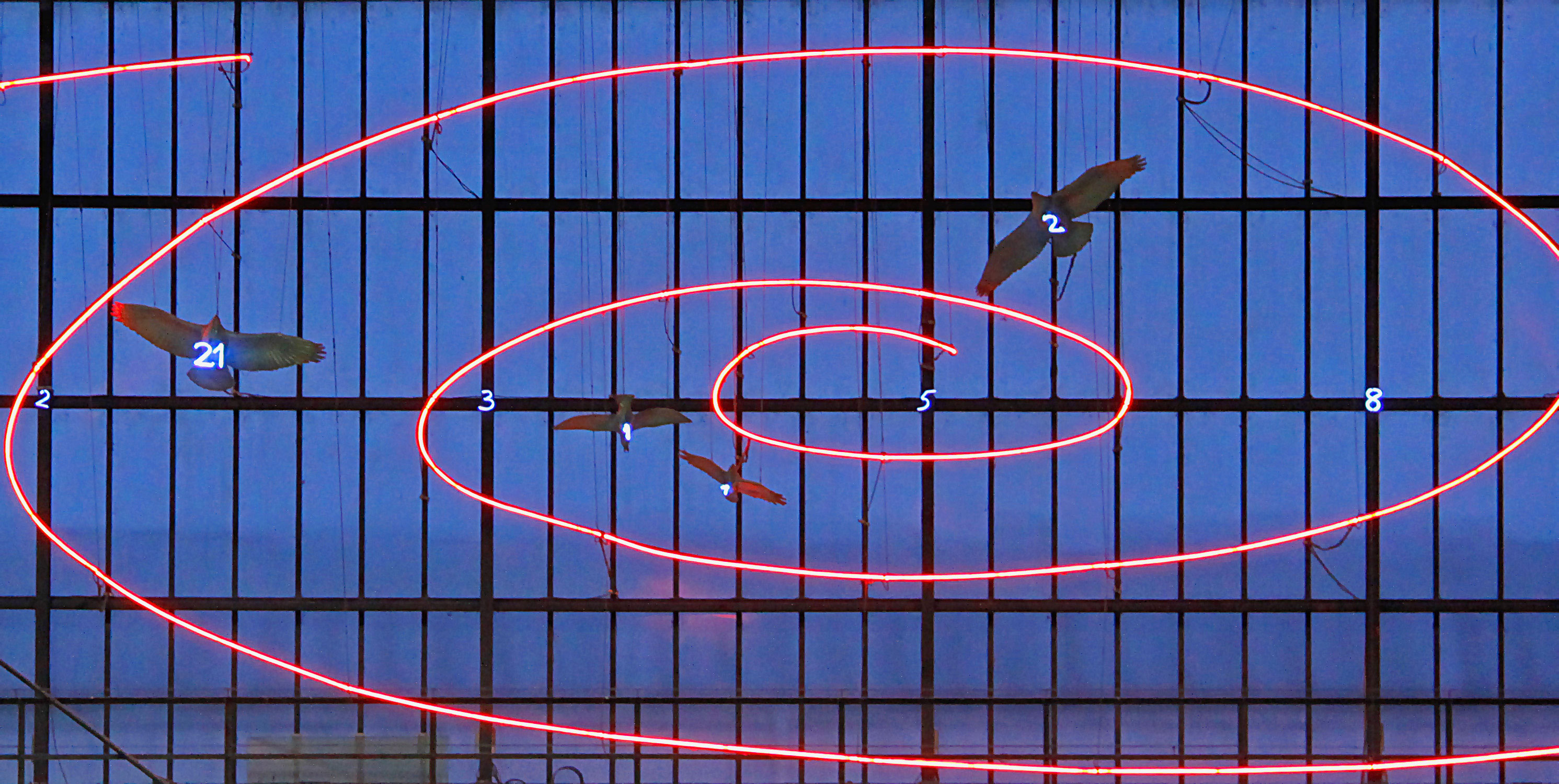
Detailed view of the Fibonacci numbers in the Zürich Hauptbahnhof.

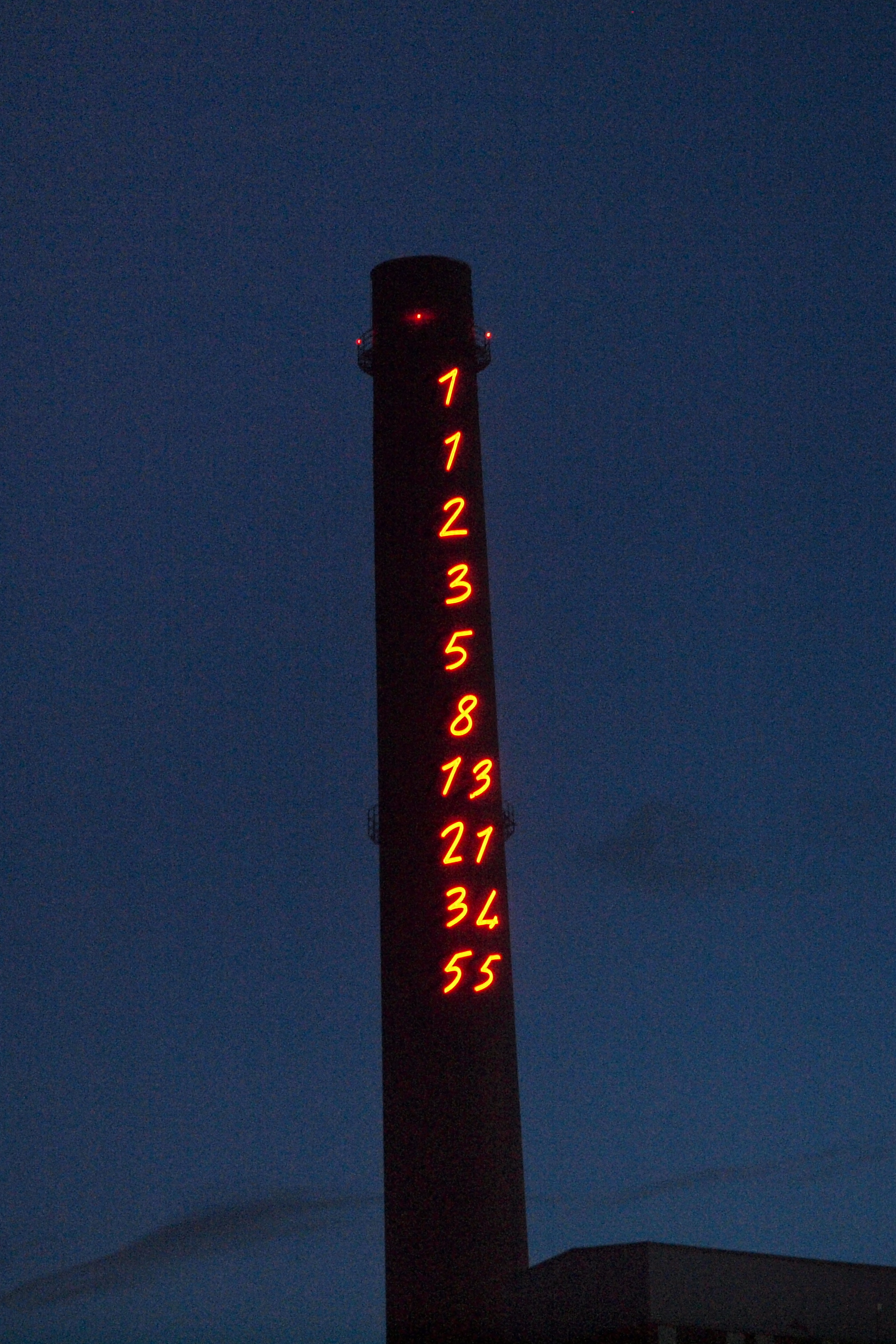
Fibonacci numbers on a chimney in Turku, Finland.

== Cinema ==
In The Phantom Tollbooth (1970), Milo (Butch Patrick) is given a set of numbers to identify in order to gain entry to the "Numbers Mine", and correctly answers noting that it is the Fibonacci sequence.

Along with the golden rectangle and golden spiral, the Fibonacci sequence is mentioned in Darren Aronofsky's independent film Pi (1998). They are used to find the name of God.

In The Da Vinci Code (2006), the numbers are used to unlock a safe. They are also placed out of order in a message to indicate that the message is also out of order (anagram).

In Mr. Magorium's Wonder Emporium (2007), Magorium hires accountant Henry Weston (Jason Bateman) after an interview in which he demonstrates knowledge of Fibonacci numbers.

In L: Change the World (2008), Near is seen arranging sugar cubes in a Fibonacci sequence.

In 21 (2008), the first seven numbers in the Fibonacci Sequence are drawn in icing on Ben's (Jim Sturgess) birthday cake. The 8th term, 21, is left out. Ben and Miles (Josh Gad) quickly figure it out.

In Nymphomaniac (2013), the character Seligman (Stellan Skarsgård) notes that when Joe (Charlotte Gainsbourg) loses her virginity, the boy who deflowers her does so in a sequence of thrusts that are Fibonacci numbers.

In Arrival (2016), character Ian Donnelly (Jeremy Renner) checks if the aliens have communicated with humans in any of the following approaches: "shapes, patterns, numbers, fibonacci".

== Comic strips ==
In the February 8, 2009, edition of FoxTrot by Bill Amend, characters Jason and Marcus take one nacho from a bowl, one more nacho, then two nachos, three nachos, five nachos, eight nachos, etc., calling it 'Fibonacho.'

In a strip of Frazz by Jef Mallett, Frazz and a student are discussing her knitted hat. The student says, "Mom sewed one sparkly here and here. Two sparklies here. Three sparklies. Five sparklies. Eight sparklies. Thirteen..." To which Frazz replies, "Fibonacci sequins, of course."

== Human development ==
John Waskom postulated that stages of human development followed the Fibonacci sequence, and that the unfolding psychology of human life would ideally be a "living proof" of the Golden Mean. This theory was originally developed and published by Norman Rose in two articles. The first article, which laid out the general theory, was entitled "Design and Development of Wholeness: Waskom's Paradigm." The second article laid out the applications and implications of the theory to the topic of moral development, and was entitled "Moral Development: The Experiential Perspective."

== Literature ==
The Fibonacci sequence plays a small part in Dan Brown's bestselling novel (and film) The Da Vinci Code.

In Philip K. Dick's novel VALIS, the Fibonacci sequence (as well as the Fibonacci constant) are used as identification signs by an organization called the "Friends of God".

In the collection of poetry Alfabet by the Danish poet Inger Christensen, the Fibonacci sequence is used to define the number of lines in each poem.

It was briefly included (and recognized by Charles Wallace Murry) in the television film adaptation of A Wrinkle in Time.

The Fibonacci sequence is frequently referenced in the 2001 book The Perfect Spiral by Jason S. Hornsby.

A youthful Fibonacci is one of the main characters in the novel Crusade in Jeans (1973). He was left out of the 2006 movie version, however.

The Fibonacci sequence and golden ratio are briefly described in John Fowles's 1985 novel A Maggot.

The Fibonacci sequence is explored in Emily Gravett's 2009 book The Rabbit Problem.

The Rabbit Problem is also described in Marina Lewycka's book Various Pets Alive and Dead.

Ice Station (1998), a novel by Australian writer Matthew Reilly, involves a partially completed access code, the remaining numbers of which can only be found by extrapolating a Fibonacci pattern.

The Fibonacci sequence is used by a serial killer to attract the protagonist Special Agent Pendergast in the Douglas Preston/Lincoln Child novel Two Graves (2012).

Eleanor Catton's novel The Luminaries (2013), winner of the 2013 Man Booker Prize, is structured around an inverse Fibonacci sequence, with each part of the book half the length of the one preceding it.

== Music ==
Bollywood lyricist Vayu's song "Beat pe Booty" from the movie A Flying Jatt mentions the Fibonacci spiral in the lyrics:

Roll Karti Jaise Barrel
Fibonacci Wala Spiral
[When you twerk, you roll as a barrel. As if tracing out a Fibonacci's Spiral.]

Hip hop duo Black Star's song "Astronomy (8th Light)" from the 1998 album Mos Def & Talib Kweli are Black Star, features the Fibonacci sequence in the chorus:

Now everybody hop on the one, the sounds of the two
It's the third eye vision, five side dimension
The 8th Light, is gonna shine bright tonight

Tool's song "Lateralus" from the album of the same name features the Fibonacci sequence symbolically in the verses of the song. The syllables in the first verse count 1, 1, 2, 3, 5, 8, 5, 13, 13, 8, 5, 3. The missing section (2, 1, 1, 2, 3, 5, 8) is later filled in during the second verse. The time signatures of the chorus change from 9/8 to 8/8 to 7/8; as drummer Danny Carey says, "It was originally titled 9-8-7. For the time signatures. Then it turned out that 987 was the 16th number of the Fibonacci sequence. So that was cool."

Fibonacci intervals (counting in semitones) in Bartók's Sonata for Two Pianos and Percussion, 3rd mov. (1937).

Ernő Lendvai analyzes Béla Bartók's works as being based on two opposing systems, that of the golden ratio and the acoustic scale. In the third movement of Bartók's Music for Strings, Percussion and Celesta, the opening xylophone passage uses Fibonacci rhythm as such: 1:1:2:3:5:8:5:3:2:1:1.

The Fibonacci numbers are also apparent in the organisation of the sections in the music of Claude Debussy's Image, Reflections in Water, in which the sequence of keys is marked out by the intervals 34, 21, 13 and 8. Italian composer and mathematical-physicist Matteo Sommacal wrote in 2002 the eight-movement suite Fibonacci's Piranhas, for piano 4, 5 and 6 hands, which makes an extensive use of the Fibonacci numbers for deriving and developing the whole melodic, rhythmic and harmonic structure of the piece.

Polish composer Krzysztof Meyer structured the values in his Trio for clarinet, cello and piano according to the Fibonacci sequence.

Fibonacci's name was adopted by a Los Angeles-based art rock group The Fibonaccis, that recorded from 1981 to 1987.

American musician BT also recorded a song titled "Fibonacci Sequence". The narrator in the song goes through all the numbers of the sequence from 1 to 21 (0 is not mentioned). The track appeared on a limited-edition version of his 1999 album Movement in Still Life, and is also featured on the second disc of the Global Underground 013: Ibiza compilation mixed by Sasha.

Voiceover and recording artist Ken Nordine described Fibonacci numbers in a word jazz piece called "Fibonacci Numbers" on his album A Transparent Mask.

Australian electronic group Angelspit uses the Fibonacci in the song "Vermin". The lyrics start with, "1, 2 3 5 8, Who do we decapitate?" and continues through a few more iterations of the sequence.

Avant garde composer Elliott Sharp used Fibonacci numbers in his compositions.

Fred Frith composed an instrumental "Ruins" for the avant-rock group Henry Cow using Fibonacci numbers to establish beat and harmony.

Composer Dave Soldier's opera with Komar and Melamid, Naked Revolution, contains a soprano aria titled "Sing of Nature, Sing of Numbers" with lyrics and music based on the Fibonacci series, sung in character by Isadora Duncan.

In 2001, American musician Doctor Steel recorded the song "Fibonacci Sequence" from the album People of Earth.

In 2018, shortly before his death, Russian hip hop artist Detsl recorded the song "Fibonacci" (in English)

== Television ==
Fibonacci numbers appear in the series The Good Place, first in the main character Eleanor's horoscope on the day she dies and as the area code on the afterlife's neighborhood.

The scientist character Walter Bishop in the television show Fringe recites the Fibonacci sequence to fall asleep. It is later revealed to be the key sequence identifying a series of safe deposit boxes he had maintained.

Square One Television's Mathnet series had a storyline that featured a parrot belonging to a deceased individual who was fascinated by the Fibonacci numbers. When "1, 1, 2, 3" is said in the parrot's presence, it responds "5, eureka!" This proves to be the key to solving the case: tiles in a garden wall are found to follow the Fibonacci sequence, with a secret compartment hidden behind the lone misplaced tile.

The Criminal Minds episode "Masterpiece" in season 4 features a serial killer who uses Fibonacci sequences to choose both the number of victims he kills at a given time, as well as the location of their hometowns.

Aliens use Fibonacci's sequence in the Taken episode "God's Equation".

In the Disney Channel TV show So Weird, the Fibonacci sequence is used to build a house. The house becomes a nexus for lost spirits. One character, Fiona, is given a choice to use it to free her father as well as the builder of the house, but ultimately chooses to free the spirits and destroys the nexus.

The Fibonacci sequence is a main plot theme in the 2012 television show Touch, produced by Fox Network and starring Kiefer Sutherland. It revolves around a number sequence 318 5296 3287 9.5 22 975 6 1188 1604 55124... and on. These numbers are calculated from using the Fibonacci sequence in some way to reveal patterns in both natural and artificial systems, essentially allowing the characters to predict the future.

In the CBS show Numb3rs episode "Thirteen", a Fibonacci sequence is embedded in a numeric code left behind by a serial killer.

On the animated TV show Adventure Time, the sequence of 8, 13, 21, is shown on the back of the Enchiridion in certain episodes.

In the Cartoon Network special The Powerpuff Girls: Dance Pantsed, one of the kidnapping victims is named Fibonacci Sequins (voiced by Ringo Starr).

In episode 11 of the Japanese anime series Aguu: Tensai Ningyou, a Fibonacci sequence is rapidly fired back-and-forth in a battle of wits between two archenemies.

In episode 14 of the Japanese anime adaptation of Banana Fish, the Fibonacci sequence is mentioned during an IQ test.

== Video games ==
A joker card named Fibonacci can be obtained in the poker-themed video game Balatro, which gives a score bonus when an Ace, 2, 3, 5, or 8 is scored.

== Visual arts ==
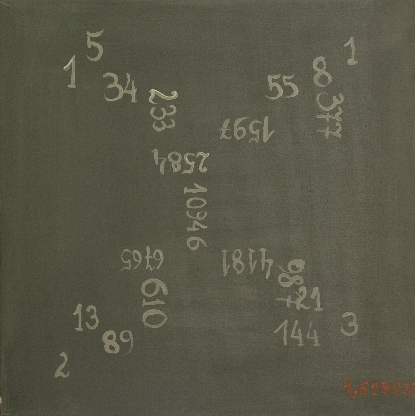
Martina Schettina: Fibonaccis Dream, 2008, 40 x 40 cm

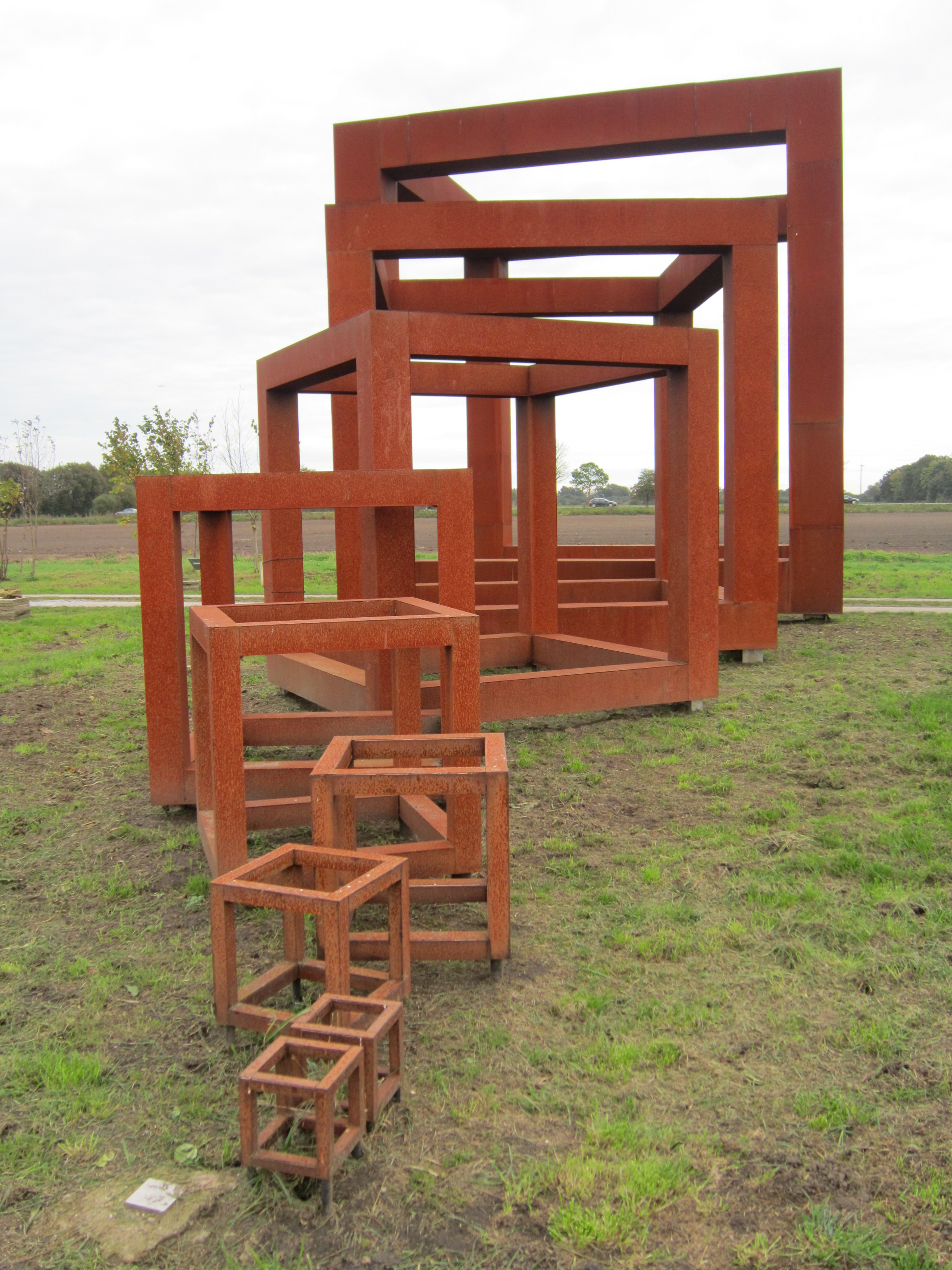
Petra Paffenholz: Fibonacci Cubes, 2014, 10 cm to 6.8 m

Artist Mario Merz made the Fibonacci sequence a recurring theme in his work. Examples are the Chimney of Turku Energia, in Turku, Finland, featuring the start of the Fibonacci sequence in 2 m high neon lights, and the representation of the first Fibonacci numbers with red neon lights on one face of the four-faced dome of the Mole Antonelliana in Turin, Italy, part of the artistic work Il volo dei Numeri ("Flight of the numbers").

Fibonacci numbers have also been used in knitting to create aesthetically appealing patterns.

The artist Martina Schettina uses Fibonacci numbers in her paintings. Her Mathemagic paintings were shown at the Museumsquartier Vienna in 2010.

Visual artist Marisa Ferreira used the Fibonacci numeral sequence to create the geometric shapes of her piece Rear Window, installed from February to August 2015 on the façade of Oslo Central Station, Norway. The artist used the sequence to express the walking pattern and rhythm of footsteps of pedestrian traffic in and out of the station.

Grace DeGennaro uses the Fibonacci sequence to accumulate the intricate patterns of dots in her paintings "to create a visible record of time."

German artist and architect Claus Bury used the Fibonacci numeral sequence in his sculptural projects.
