= Liber Abaci =

Mathematics book written in 1202 by Fibonacci

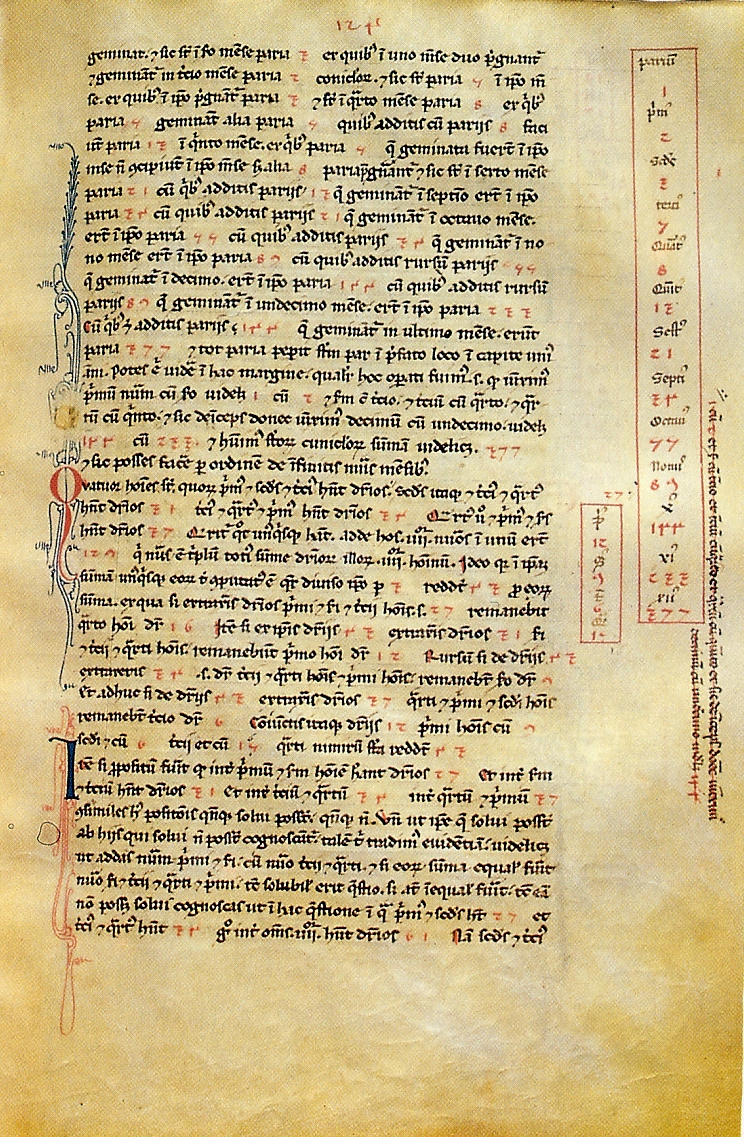
A page of the Liber Abaci from the National Central Library. The list on the right shows the numbers 1, 2, 3, 5, 8, 13, 21, 34, 55, 89, 144, 233, 377 (the Fibonacci sequence). The 2, 8, and 9 resemble Arabic numerals more than Eastern Arabic numerals or Indian numerals.

The Liber Abaci or Liber Abbaci (Latin for "The Book of Calculation") was a 1202 Latin work on arithmetic by Leonardo of Pisa, posthumously known as Fibonacci. It is primarily famous for introducing both base-10 positional notation and the symbols known as Arabic numerals in Europe.

== Premise ==
Liber Abaci was among the first Western books to describe the Hindu–Arabic numeral system and to use symbols resembling modern "Arabic numerals". By addressing the applications of both commercial tradesmen and mathematicians, it promoted the superiority of the system and the use of these glyphs.

Although the book's title is sometimes translated as "The Book of the Abacus", Sigler (2002) notes that the word in the title does not refer to the abacus as a calculating device. Rather, the word "abacus" was used at the time to refer to calculation in any form; the spelling "abbacus" with two "b"s was, and still is in Italy, used to refer to calculation using Hindu-Arabic numerals. The book describes methods of doing calculations without aid of an abacus, and as Ore (1948) confirms, for centuries after its publication the algorismists (followers of the style of calculation demonstrated in Liber Abaci) remained in conflict with the abacists (traditionalists who continued to use the abacus in conjunction with Roman numerals). Carl Boyer emphasizes in his History of Mathematics that although "Liber abaci...is not on the abacus" per se, nevertheless "...it is a very thorough treatise on algebraic methods and problems in which the use of the Hindu-Arabic numerals is strongly advocated."

== Summary of sections ==
The first section introduces the Hindu–Arabic numeral system, including its arithmetic and methods for converting between different representation systems. This section also includes the first known description of trial division for testing whether a number is composite and, if so, factoring it.

The second section presents examples from commerce, such as conversions of currency and measurements, and calculations of profit and interest.

The third section discusses a number of mathematical problems; for instance, it includes the Chinese remainder theorem, perfect numbers and Mersenne primes as well as formulas for arithmetic series and for square pyramidal numbers. Another example in this chapter involves the growth of a population of rabbits, where the solution requires generating a numerical sequence. Although the resulting Fibonacci sequence dates back long before Leonardo, its inclusion in his book is why the sequence is named after him today.

The fourth section derives approximations, both numerical and geometrical, of irrational numbers such as square roots.

The book also includes proofs in Euclidean geometry. Fibonacci's method of solving algebraic equations shows the influence of the early 10th-century Egyptian mathematician Abū Kāmil Shujāʿ ibn Aslam.

== Fibonacci's notation for fractions ==
In Liber Abaci, Fibonacci's notation for rational numbers is intermediate in form between the Egyptian fractions commonly used until that time and the vulgar fractions still in use today. It differs from modern fraction notation in three key ways:

1. Modern notation generally writes a fraction to the right of the whole number to which it is added, for instance $2\,\tfrac13$ for 7/3. Fibonacci instead would write the same fraction to the left, i.e., $\tfrac13\,2$.
2. Fibonacci used a composite fraction notation in which a sequence of numerators and denominators shared the same fraction bar; each such term represented an additional fraction of the given numerator divided by the product of all the denominators below and to the right of it. That is, $\tfrac{b\,\,a}{d\,\,c} = \tfrac{a}{c} + \tfrac{b}{cd}$, and $\tfrac{c\,\,b\,\,a}{f\,\,e\,\,d} = \tfrac{a}{d} + \tfrac{b}{de} + \tfrac{c}{def}$. The notation was read from right to left. For example, 29/30 could be written as $\tfrac{1\,\,2\,\,4}{2\,\,3\,\,5}$, representing the value $\tfrac45+\tfrac2{3\times5}+\tfrac1{2\times3\times5}$. This can be viewed as a form of mixed radix notation and was very convenient for dealing with traditional systems of weights, measures, and currency. For instance, for units of length, a foot is 1/3 of a yard, and an inch is 1/12 of a foot, so a quantity of 5 yards, 2 feet, and $7 \tfrac34$ inches could be represented as a composite fraction: $\tfrac{3\ \,7\,\,2}{4\,\,12\,\,3}\,5$ yards. However, typical notations for traditional measures, while similarly based on mixed radixes, do not write out the denominators explicitly; the explicit denominators in Fibonacci's notation allow him to use different radixes for different problems when convenient. Sigler also points out an instance where Fibonacci uses composite fractions in which all denominators are 10, prefiguring modern decimal notation for fractions.
3. Fibonacci sometimes wrote several fractions next to each other, representing a sum of the given fractions. For instance, 1/3+1/4 = 7/12, so a notation like $\tfrac14\,\tfrac13\,2$ would represent the number that would now more commonly be written as the mixed number $2\,\tfrac{7}{12}$, or simply the improper fraction $\tfrac{31}{12}$. Notation of this form can be distinguished from sequences of numerators and denominators sharing a fraction bar by the visible break in the bar. If all numerators are 1 in a fraction written in this form, and all denominators are different from each other, the result is an Egyptian fraction representation of the number. This notation was also sometimes combined with the composite fraction notation: two composite fractions written next to each other would represent the sum of the fractions.

The complexity of this notation allows numbers to be written in many different ways, and Fibonacci described several methods for converting from one style of representation to another. In particular, chapter II.7 contains a list of methods for converting an improper fraction to an Egyptian fraction, including the greedy algorithm for Egyptian fractions, also known as the Fibonacci–Sylvester expansion.

== Modus Indorum ==
In the Liber Abaci, Fibonacci wrote the following, introducing the affirmative Modus Indorum (the method of the Indians), today known as Hindu–Arabic numeral system or base-10 positional notation. It also introduced digits that greatly resembled the modern Arabic numerals.

As my father was a public official away from our homeland in the Bugia customshouse established for the Pisan merchants who frequently gathered there, he had me in my youth brought to him, looking to find for me a useful and comfortable future; there he wanted me to be in the study of mathematics and to be taught for some days. There from a marvelous instruction in the art of the nine Indian figures, the introduction and knowledge of the art pleased me so much above all else, and I learnt from them, whoever was learned in it, from nearby Egypt, Syria, Greece, Sicily and Provence, and their various methods, to which locations of business I travelled considerably afterwards for much study, and I learnt from the assembled disputations. But this, on the whole, the algorithm and even the Pythagorean arcs, I still reckoned almost an error compared to the Indian method. Therefore strictly embracing the Indian method, and attentive to the study of it, from mine own sense adding some, and some more still from the subtle Euclidean geometric art, applying the sum that I was able to perceive to this book, I worked to put it together in xv distinct chapters, showing certain proof for almost everything that I put in, so that further, this method perfected above the rest, this science is instructed to the eager, and to the Italian people above all others, who up to now are found without a minimum. If, by chance, something less or more proper or necessary I omitted, your indulgence for me is entreated, as there is no one who is without fault, and in all things is altogether circumspect.

The nine Indian figures are:
9 8 7 6 5 4 3 2 1
With these nine figures, and with the sign 0 which the Arabs call zephir any number whatsoever is written...

In other words, he advocated the use of the digits 0–9, and of place value. Until this time Europe used Roman numerals, making modern mathematics almost impossible. The book thus made an important contribution to the spread of decimal numerals. The spread of the Hindu-Arabic system, however, as Ore writes, was "long-drawn-out", taking many more centuries to spread widely, and did not become complete until the later part of the 16th century, accelerating dramatically only in the 1500s with the advent of printing.

== Textual history ==
=== Predecessors ===
Fibonacci was deeply influenced by Muslim scholars from the 9th and 10 centuries.

According to Rashed...in the examination of a set of some 90 algebraic problems within Liber abaci, 22 of them were found to have been borrowed from Al-Khwˆarizmˆı’s book on algebra (Al-Jabr wa'l muqabala, written around 830 CE) and 53 from Abˆu Kˆamil’s book on algebra (Kitab fi al-jabr wa’l-muqabala, or Book on completion and balancing, written around 912 CE). One deals with exactly the same problems with occasionally a minor change in the numerical coefficients.

— T.C. Scott and P. Marketos, On the origin of the Fibonacci Sequence, 2.2.1. Historical Issues

=== Publication ===
The first appearance of the manuscript was in 1202. No copies of this version are known. A revised version of Liber Abaci, dedicated to Michael Scot, appeared in 1228. There are at least nineteen manuscripts extant containing parts of this text. There are three complete versions of this manuscript from the thirteenth and fourteenth centuries. There are a further nine incomplete copies known between the thirteenth and fifteenth centuries, and there may be more not yet identified.

There were no known printed versions of Liber Abaci until Boncompagni's 1857 edition. The first complete English translation was Sigler's text, published in 2002.

== See also ==
- The Book of Squares
