= Tunnell's theorem =

On areas of rational right triangles

In number theory, Tunnell's theorem gives a partial resolution to the congruent number problem, and under the Birch and Swinnerton-Dyer conjecture, a full resolution.

== Congruent number problem ==
The congruent number problem asks which positive integers can be the area of a right triangle with all three sides rational. Tunnell's theorem relates this to the number of integral solutions of a few fairly simple Diophantine equations.

== Theorem ==
For a given square-free integer n, define

$$\begin{align}
A_n & = \#\{ (x,y,z) \in \mathbb{Z}^3 \mid n = 2x^2 + y^2 + 32z^2 \}, \\
B_n & = \#\{ (x,y,z) \in \mathbb{Z}^3 \mid n = 2x^2 + y^2 + 8z^2 \}, \\
C_n & = \#\{ (x,y,z) \in \mathbb{Z}^3 \mid n = 8x^2 + 2y^2 + 64z^2 \}, \\
D_n & = \#\{ (x,y,z) \in \mathbb{Z}^3 \mid n = 8x^2 + 2y^2 + 16z^2 \}.
\end{align}$$

Tunnell's theorem states that supposing n is a congruent number, if n is odd then 2A_{n} = B_{n} and if n is even then 2C_{n} = D_{n}. Conversely, if the Birch and Swinnerton-Dyer conjecture holds true for elliptic curves of the form $y^2 = x^3 - n^2x$, these equalities are sufficient to conclude that n is a congruent number.

== History ==
The theorem is named for Jerrold B. Tunnell, a number theorist at Rutgers University, who proved it in Tunnell (1983).

== Importance ==
The importance of Tunnell's theorem is that the criterion it gives is testable by a finite calculation. For instance, for a given $n$, the numbers $A_n,B_n,C_n,D_n$ can be calculated by exhaustively searching through $x,y,z$ in the range $-\sqrt{n},\ldots,\sqrt{n}$.

== See also ==
- Birch and Swinnerton-Dyer conjecture
- Congruent number
