= Abu Ja'far al-Khazin =

Persian astronomer and mathematician

Al-Khazin
- ابوجعفر خازن خراسانی
- Born: 900
- Died: 971

Academic work
- Era: Islamic Golden Age
- Main interests: Mathematics, astronomy

Abu Jafar Muhammad ibn Husayn Khazin (Persian: ابوجعفر خازن خراسانی; 900–971), also called Al-Khazin, was an Iranian Muslim astronomer and mathematician from Khorasan. He worked on both astronomy and number theory.

Al-Khazin was one of the scientists brought to the court in Ray, Iran by the ruler of the Buyid dynasty, Adhad ad-Dowleh, who ruled from 949 to 983. In 959/960, Khazin was required to measure the obliquity of the ecliptic by the vizier of Ray, who was appointed by ad-Dowleh.

One of Al-Khazin's works Zij al-Safa'ih ("Tables of the Disks of the Astrolabe") was described by his successors as the best work in the field and they make many references to it. The work describes some astronomical instruments, in particular an astrolabe fitted with plates inscribed with tables, and a commentary on the use of these. A copy of this instrument was made, but it vanished in Germany during World War II. A photograph of this copy was taken and examined by the historian David King in 1980.

Al-Khazin also wrote a commentary on the Roman polymath Ptolemy's Almagest in which he gives 19 propositions relating to statements by Ptolemy, and proposed a different model of the cosmos.

== Mathematics ==
Al-Khazin was the first to formulate and solve the congruum problem.

== Sources ==
- Dold-Samplonius, Yvonne (1981). "Al-Khāzin, Abū Ja'far Muḥammad Ibn Al-Ḥasan Al-Khurāsānī". In Gillispie, Charles Coulston; Holmes, Frederic Lawrence (eds.). Dictionary of Scientific Biography. Vol. 7 & 8. New York: Scribner. OCLC 755137603.
- King, David A. (2007). "New Light on the Zīij al-Safāa'ih of Abū Jacfar al-Khāzin". Centaurus. 23 (2): 105–117. doi:10.1111/j.1600-0498.1979.tb00226.x. ISSN 0008-8994 – via ResearchGate.
- Selin, Helaine (1997). Encyclopaedia of the History of Science, Technology, and Medicine in Non-Western Cultures. Berlin; New York: Springer Nature. ISBN 978-1-4020-4960-6.
