= Fibonacci =

Italian mathematician (c. 1170 – c. 1240/50)

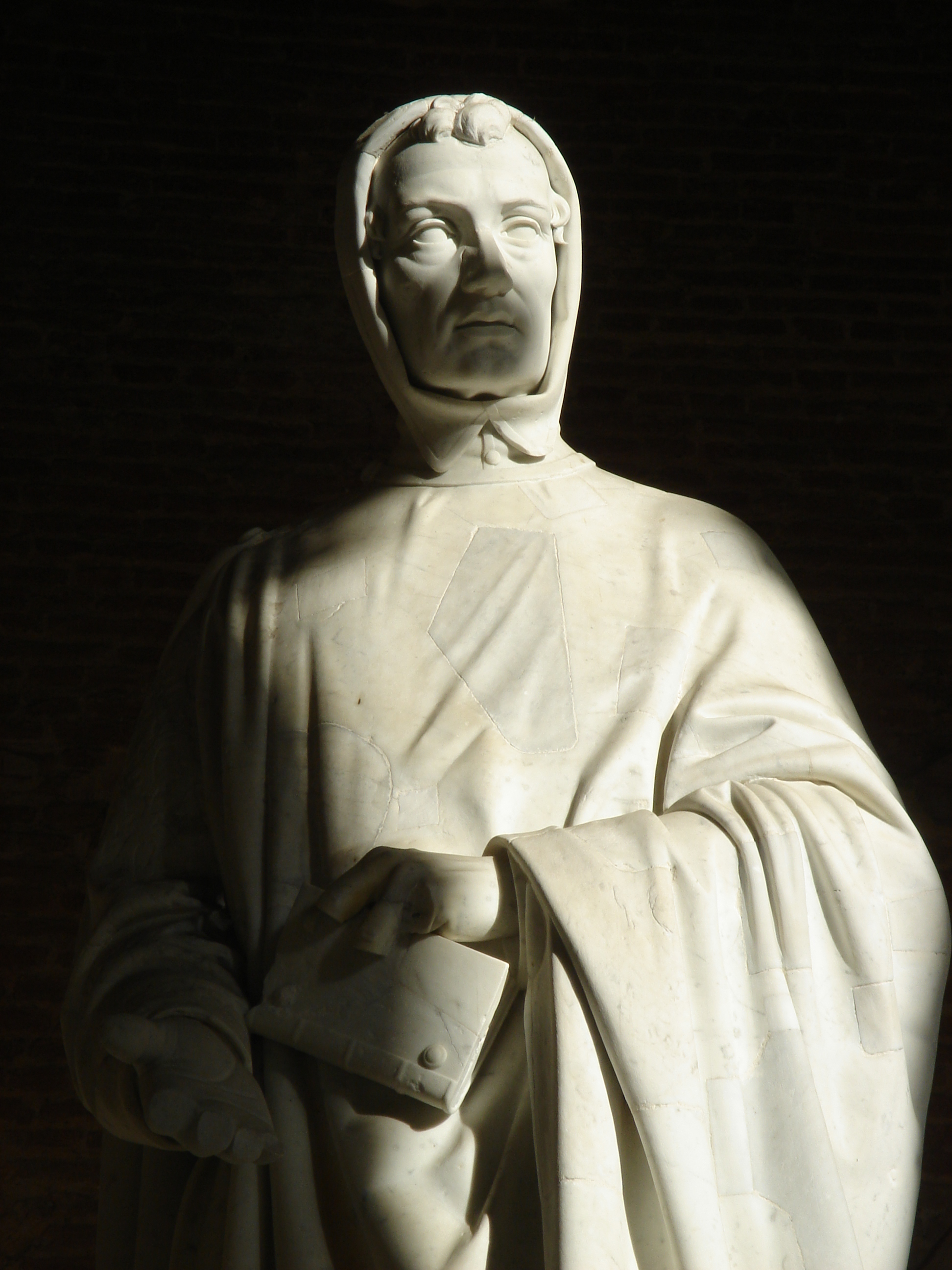
- Statue of Fibonacci (1863) by Giovanni Paganucci in the Camposanto Monumentale, Pisa (Note: Fibonacci's actual appearance is not known.)
- Born: Leonardo Bonacci c. 1170; Pisa, Republic of Pisa
- Died: c. 1250 (aged 79–80); Pisa, Republic of Pisa
- Other names: Leonardo Fibonacci; Lionardo Fibonacci; Leonardo di Pisa; Leonardo Bigollo Pisano
- Occupation: Mathematician
- Known for: Liber Abaci; Popularizing the Hindu–Arabic numeral system in Europe; Congruum; Fibonacci numbers; Fibonacci–Sylvester method; Fibonacci method
- Father: Guglielmo Bonacci

Leonardo Bonacci, also Leonardo da Pisa (c. 1170 – c. 1240-50), commonly known as Fibonacci, (Note: /ˌfɪbəˈnɑːtʃi/ FIB-ə-NAH-chee, US also /ˌfiːb-/ FEEB-, Italian: [fiboˈnattʃi].) (Note: Also known as Leonardo of Pisa (Italian: Leonardo di Pisa) or Leonardo Bigollo Pisano ('Leonardo the Traveller from Pisa').) was an Italian mathematician from the Republic of Pisa, considered to be "the most talented Western mathematician of the Middle Ages".

The name he is commonly called, Fibonacci, is first found in a modern source in a 1838 text by the Franco-Italian mathematician Guglielmo Libri and is short for filius Bonacci ('son of Bonacci'). (Note: The etymology of Bonacci is 'good-natured', so the full name means 'son from a good-natured [family]'.) However, even as early as 1506, Perizolo, a notary of the Holy Roman Empire, mentions him as "Lionardo Fibonacci".

Fibonacci popularized the Indo–Arabic numeral system in the Western world primarily through his composition in 1202 of Liber Abaci (Book of Calculation) and also introduced Europe to the sequence of Fibonacci numbers, which he used as an example in Liber Abaci.

== Biography ==
Fibonacci was born around 1170 to Guglielmo, an Italian merchant and customs official who directed a trading post in Bugia, modern-day Béjaïa, Algeria. Fibonacci travelled with him as a young boy. He was educated in Bugia, where he learned about the Hindu–Arabic numeral system.

Fibonacci travelled around the Mediterranean coast, meeting with many merchants and learning about their systems of doing arithmetic. (Note: In the Prologus of the Liber abacci he writes: Having been introduced there to this art with an amazing method of teaching by means of the nine figures of the Indians, I loved the knowledge of such an art to such an extent above all other arts and so much did I devote myself to it with my intellect, that I learned with very earnest application and through the technique of contradiction anything to be studied concerning it and its various methods used in Egypt, in Syria, in Greece, in Sicily, and in Provence, places I have later visited for the purpose of commerce.") He soon realised the many advantages of the Hindu-Arabic system, which, unlike the Roman numerals used at the time, allowed easy calculation using a place-value system. In 1202, he completed the Liber Abaci (Book of Abacus or The Book of Calculation), (Note: The English edition of the Liber abacci was published by L.E. Sigler, Leonardo Pisano's book of calculation, New York, Springer-Verlag, 2003.) which popularized Hindu–Arabic numerals in Europe.

Fibonacci was a guest of Emperor Frederick II, who enjoyed mathematics and science. A member of Frederick II's court, John of Palermo, posed several questions based on Arab mathematical works for Fibonacci to solve. In 1240, the Republic of Pisa honored Fibonacci (referred to as Leonardo Bigollo) (Note: In Flos: "Incipit flos Leonardi bigolli pisani..." [Here starts 'the flower' by Leonardo the wanderer of Pisa...] The basic meanings of bigollo appear to be "bilingual" or "traveller". A. F. Horadam contends a connotation of bigollo is "absent-minded", which is also one of the connotations of the English word "wandering". The translation "the wanderer" in the quote above tries to combine the various connotations of the word "bigollo" in a single English word.) by granting him a salary in a decree that recognized him for the services that he had given to the city as an advisor on matters of accounting and instruction to citizens.

Fibonacci is thought to have died between 1240 and 1250, in Pisa.

== Liber Abaci ==
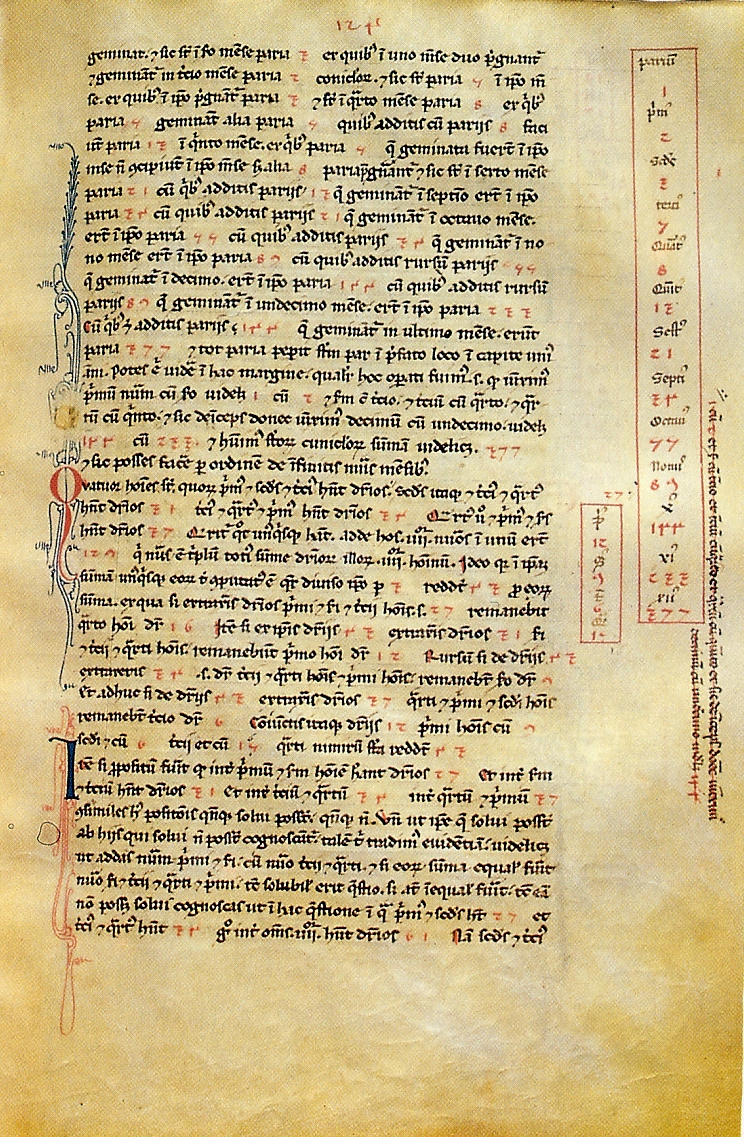
A page of Fibonacci's Liber Abaci from the Biblioteca Nazionale di Firenze showing (in box on right) the Fibonacci sequence with the position in the sequence labeled with Latin numbers and Roman numerals and the value in Hindu-Arabic numerals

In the Liber Abaci (1202), Fibonacci introduced the so-called modus Indorum (method of the Indians), today known as the Hindu–Arabic numeral system, with ten digits including a zero and positional notation. The book showed the practical use and value of this by applying the numerals to commercial bookkeeping, converting weights and measures, calculation of interest, money-changing, and other applications. The book was well-received throughout educated Europe and had a profound influence on European thought. Replacing Roman numerals, its ancient Egyptian multiplication method, and using an abacus for calculations, was an advance in making business calculations easier and faster, which assisted the growth of banking and accounting in Europe.

The original 1202 manuscript is not known to exist. In a 1228 copy of the manuscript, the first section introduces the numeral system and compares it with others, such as Roman numerals, and methods to convert numbers to it. The second section explains uses in business, for example converting different currencies, and calculating profit and interest, which were important to the growing banking industry. The book also discusses irrational numbers and prime numbers.

== Fibonacci sequence ==
Liber Abaci posed and solved a problem involving the growth of a population of rabbits based on idealized assumptions. The solution, generation by generation, was a sequence of numbers later known as Fibonacci numbers. Although Fibonacci's Liber Abaci contains the earliest known description of the sequence outside of India, the sequence had been described by Indian mathematicians as early as the sixth century.

In the Fibonacci sequence, each number is the sum of the previous two numbers. Fibonacci omitted the "0" and first "1" included today and began the sequence with 1, 2, 3, .... He carried the calculation up to the thirteenth place, the value 233, though another manuscript carries it to the next place, the value 377. Fibonacci did not speak about the golden ratio as the limit of the ratio of consecutive numbers in this sequence.

== Legacy ==
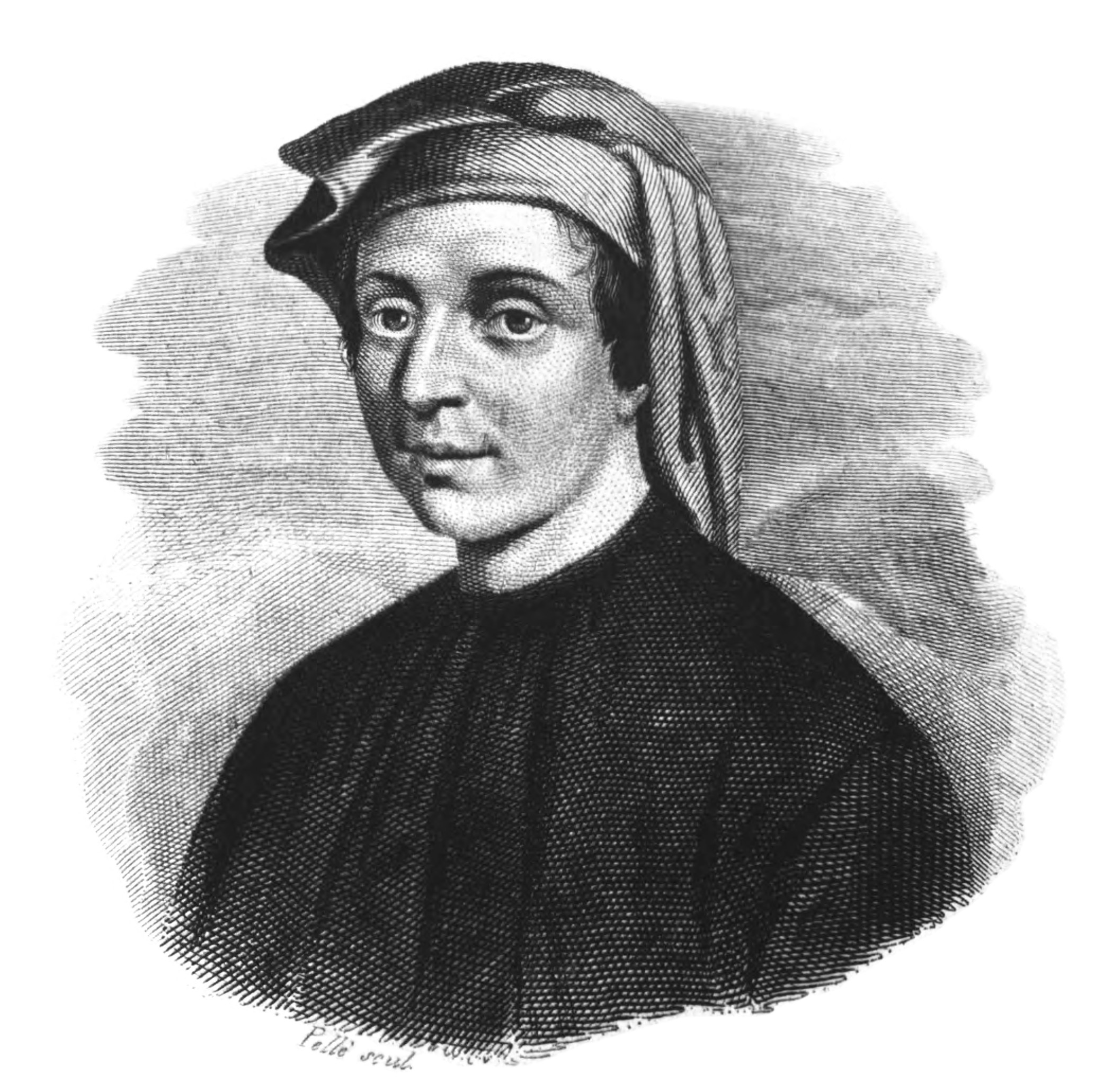
Modern engraving of Fibonacci, not based on authentic sources. There are no known authentic descriptions or portraits of Fibonacci.

In the 19th century, a statue of Fibonacci was set in Pisa. Today it is located in the western gallery of the Camposanto, historical cemetery on the Piazza dei Miracoli.

There are many mathematical concepts named after Fibonacci because of a connection to the Fibonacci numbers. Examples include the Brahmagupta–Fibonacci identity, the Fibonacci search technique, and the Pisano period. Beyond mathematics, namesakes of Fibonacci include the asteroid 6765 Fibonacci and the art rock band The Fibonaccis.

== Works ==
- Liber Abaci (1202), a book on calculations (English translation by Laurence Sigler, 2002)
- Practica Geometriae (1220), a compendium of techniques in surveying, the measurement and partition of areas and volumes, and other topics in practical geometry (English translation by Barnabas Hughes, Springer, 2008).
- Flos (1225), solutions to problems posed by Johannes of Palermo
- Liber quadratorum ("The Book of Squares") on Diophantine equations, dedicated to Emperor Frederick II. See in particular congruum and the Brahmagupta–Fibonacci identity.
- Di minor guisa (on commercial arithmetic; lost)
- Commentary on Book X of Euclid's Elements (lost)

== See also ==
- Fibonacci numbers in popular culture
- Republic of Pisa
- Adelard of Bath
