= The Book of Squares =

Book on algebra by Leonardo Fibonacci

The Book of Squares, (Liber Quadratorum in the original Latin) is a book on algebra by Leonardo Fibonacci, published in 1225. It was dedicated to Frederick II, Holy Roman Emperor.

After being brought to Pisa by Master Dominick to the feet of your celestial majesty, most glorious prince, Lord F.,

— Leonardo Fibonacci, Liber quadratorum, epistle (translated by L. E. Sigler)

The Liber quadratorum has been passed down by a single 15th-century manuscript, the so-called ms. E 75 Sup. of the Biblioteca Ambrosiana (Milan, Italy), ff. 19r–39v. During the 19th century, the work was published for the first time in a printed edition by Baldassarre Boncompagni Ludovisi, prince of Piombino.

Appearing in the book is Fibonacci's identity, establishing that the set of all sums of two squares is closed under multiplication. The book anticipated the works of later mathematicians such as Fermat and Euler. The book examines several topics in number theory, among them an inductive method for finding Pythagorean triples based on the sequence of odd integers, the fact that the sum of the first $n$ odd integers is $n^2$, and the solution to the congruum problem.
