= Uunartoq Disc =

Possible Norse sun compass discovered in Greenland

The Uunartoq disc is an artifact discovered in the ruins of a Norse Greenland homestead. It is widely believed to be an early Norse sun compass.

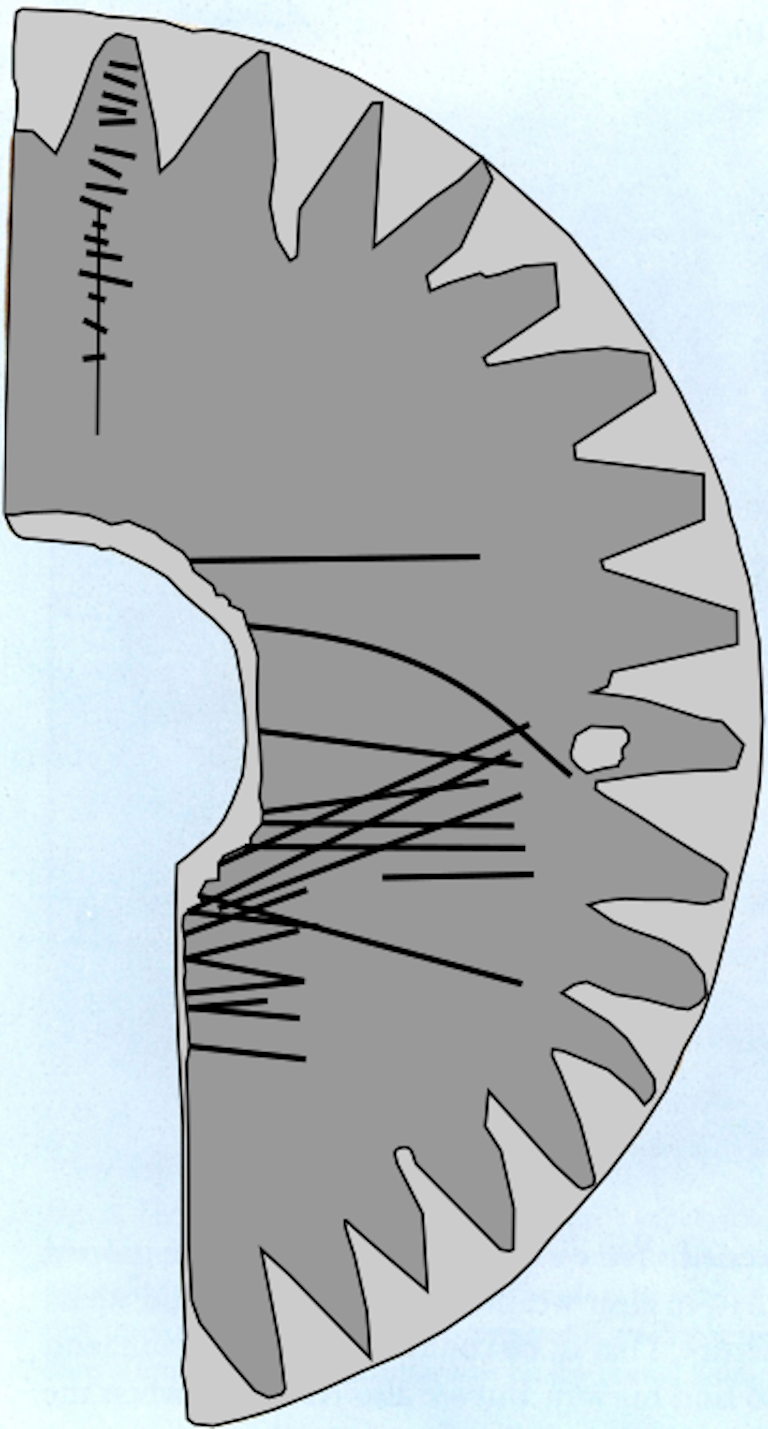

== Discovery ==
The disappearance of the Norse Greenlanders at some point in the 15th century remains one of the great historical mysteries. In 1948, Danish archaeologist Christen Vebæk was excavating the ruins of the Norse site Ø149 located on the western shore of a fjord known to the Norse as Siglufjord and today called Uunartoq ("the hot"), a name that denotes both the fjord and the islands at its mouth. One of the islands is the site of geothermal hot springs, well known to the Norse and the Inuit and now a popular destination among tourists.

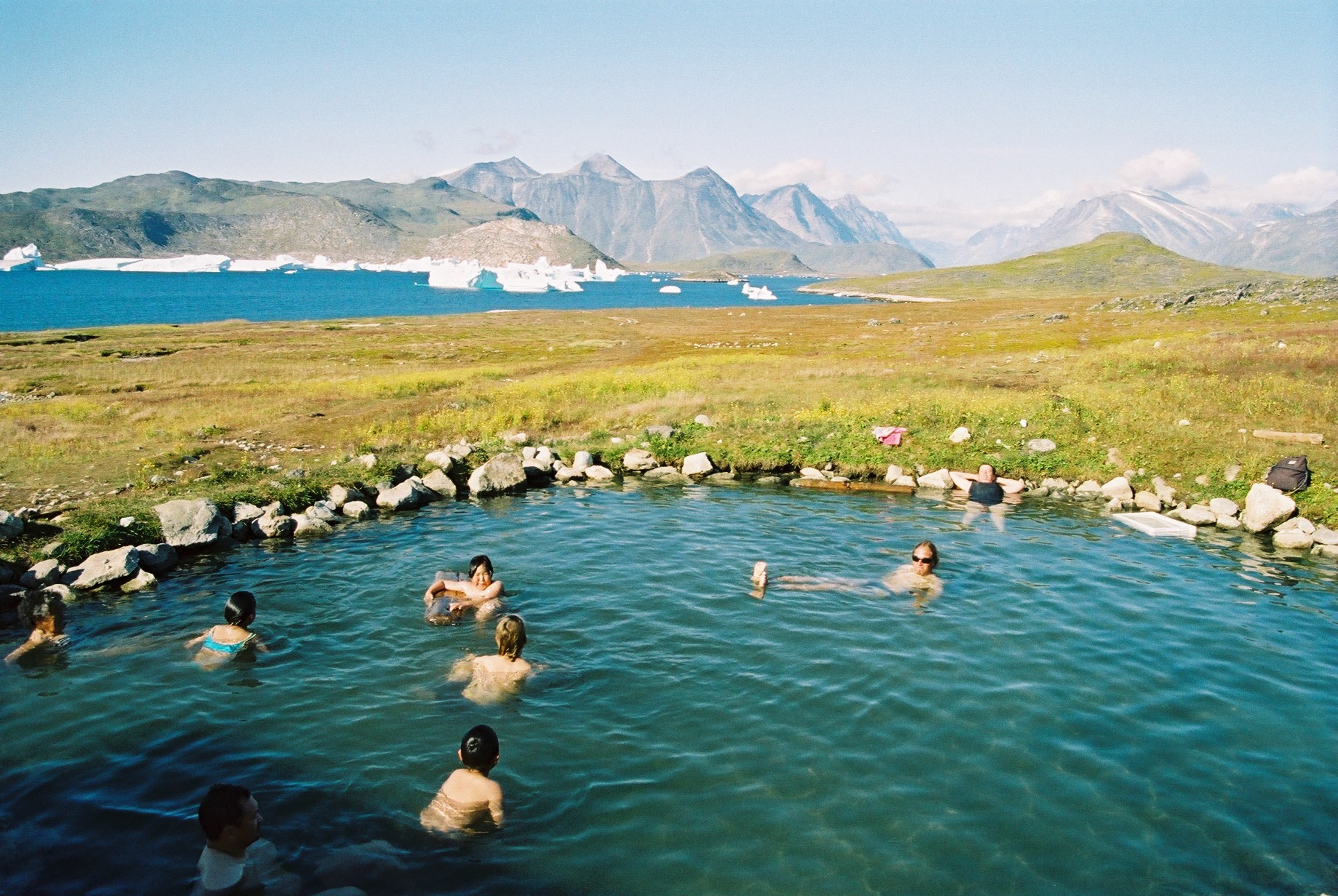
Hot springs on Uunartoq, formerly called Siglufjord by the Norse. The Uunartoq disc was discovered on the opposite shore of this fjord, in the center background.

The ruins at site Ø149 include a church and it is generally accepted to be the colony's Benedictine Convent referenced by Ivar Bardarson, a Norwegian priest who lived in the colony in the mid-14th century as a representative of the Archdiocese of Nidaros and the Norwegian crown.

Among other artifacts, Vebæk discovered a fragment of a wooden disc with triangular notches chip-carved around the perimeter and a hole in the centre. It was fashioned from softwood, likely larch or spruce (some sources indicate oak), and it measured just 7 centimetres wide, 1 centimetre thick and the central hole was 1.7 centimetres in diameter.

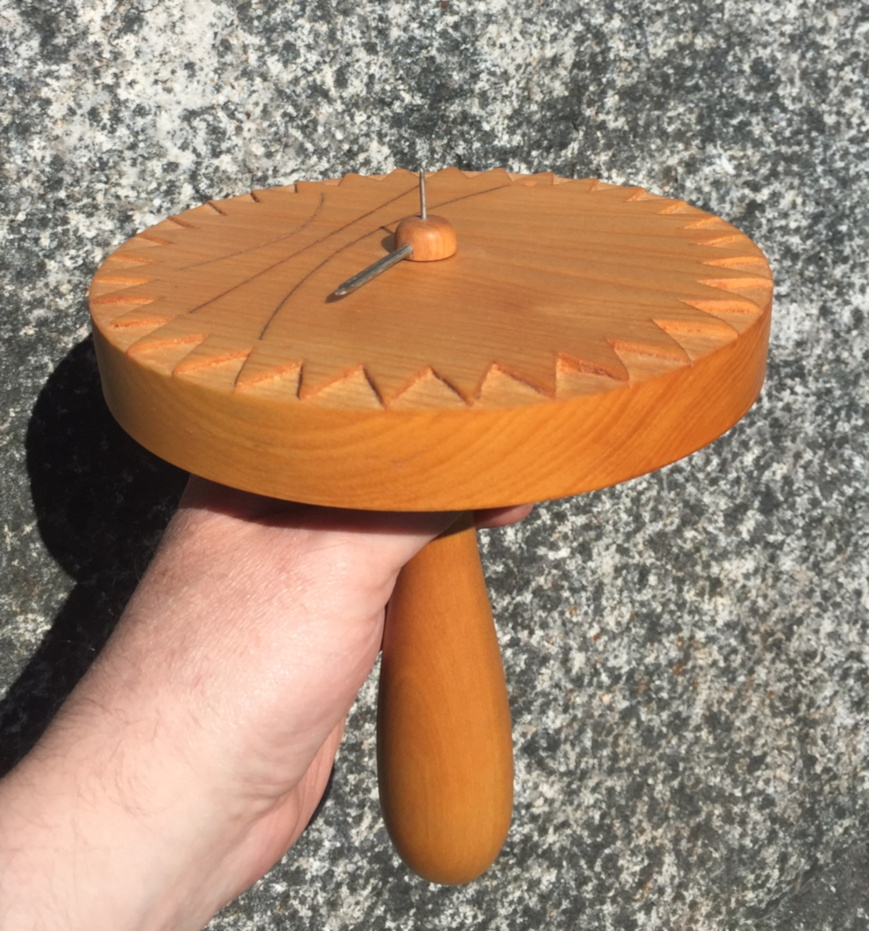
A modern speculative replica of the Uunartoq disc, considerably larger than the original.

Danish marine captain and naval historian Carl V. Sølver examined the notches and deliberate scored lines on the disc and pronounced it to be a sun compass used to determine true north, with the hole in the centre intended for a handle that housed a horizontal directional pin and a vertical pin to cast a shadow. Sølver drew a speculative illustration from which a replica was fashioned, and this explanation was ultimately accepted by Vebæk. The discovery of the artifact prompted increased interest among historians about the possible use of navigational instruments by the Norse, as many experts assumed that they relied solely on non-instrumental resources such as celestial bodies, landmarks or intuition. The magnetic compass does not appear to have been in use in Europe until the early 13th century. While the North Star had become an important navigational tool by the time of Pytheas and regarded as the "Ship-star" by the 10th century, mariners on the open ocean out of sight from any landmark would have had great difficulty in precisely determining true north during daylight hours.

While some scholars continued to argue against the theory of Norse marine instrumentation, the discovery of a similar artifact with gnomonic lines in a Polish archaeological site near Wolin in 2000 has given further credence to the sun compass theory, particularly since the site dates from a period when the Norse had considerable impact in the region.

== Method of use ==
Like a sundial, a sun compass features a vertical pin. The sun's rays cause the pin to cast a shadow which is longer in the morning and late afternoon and shortest at solar high-noon, and this shadow is used to create gnomonic lines. The disc is placed in a fixed level position and an observer regularly marks the different lengths and positions of the pin's shadow across the disc during the course of the day. When the pin tip shadow marks are connected, the result is a west-to-east gnomonic line that comes closest to the vertical pin at high-noon. In the northern hemisphere, a straight line drawn from the base of the pin to that closest high-noon position will point directly to true north, which will then serve as the compass' north index mark. The gnomonic line will be essentially straight during the vernal and autumnal equinoxes, and downward concave at the summer solstice.

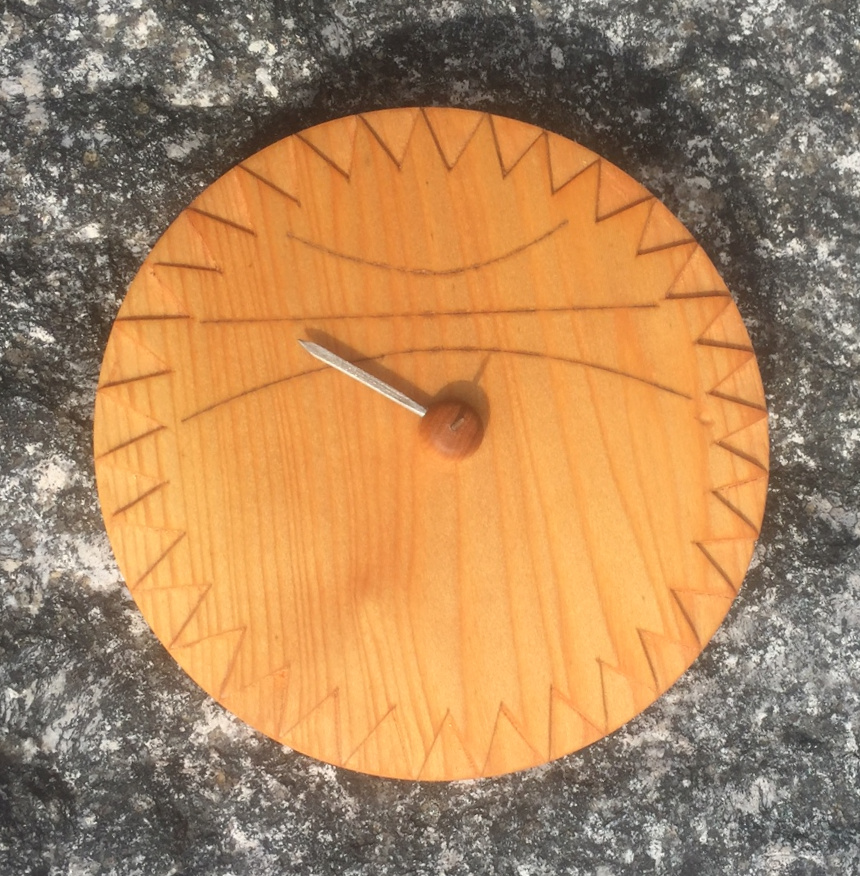
Modern replica showing gnomonic lines for the summer solstice (bottom), vernal and autumnal equinoxes (middle) and winter solstice (top). The original Uunartoq disc does not feature a line corresponding to the winter solstice, which would likely have been impractical during the limited daylight and low sun angle in Greenland at that time of year.

Once these lines have been inscribed on the face of the compass, it can be used during travel. The user holds the device level and rotates it until the pin tip's shadow touches the appropriate seasonal gnomonic line, and the index mark will point to true north.

Sølver noted that the Uunartoq disc appeared to have gnomonic lines consistent with those produced during the summer solstice and the equinoxes (which in 1990 were microscopically shown to be deliberately double traced) and also noted that the disc had 8 triangular dial increments per quadrant, for a total of 32, corresponding with the traditional mariner's compass. In addition to its gnomonic lines, it also had a round dimple on the 9th increment that corresponds with east, where the lines end with the setting of the sun in the west.

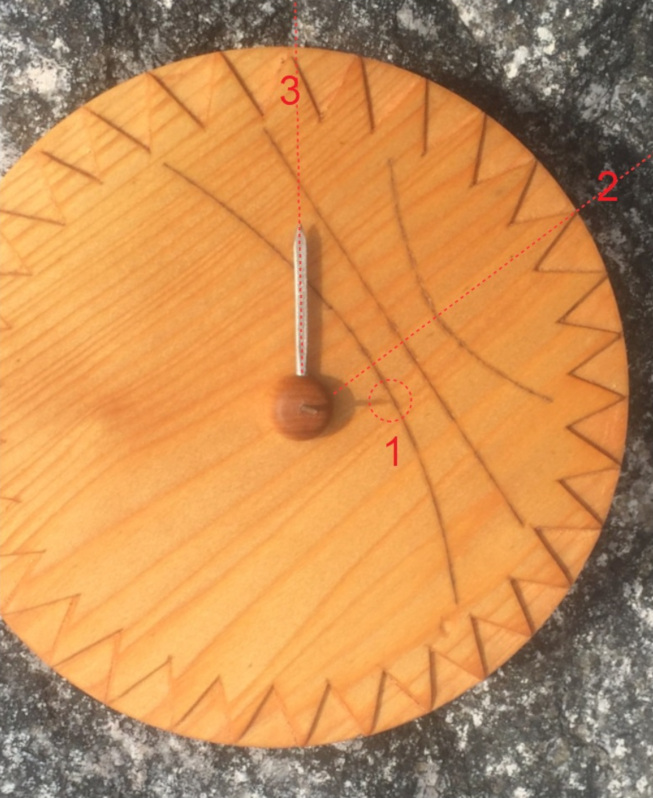
Modern replica showing how a course of Northwest by West may have been plotted by the Uunartoq disc's user around the time of the summer solstice. The traveller rotates the disc while keeping it level until the vertical gnomonic pin tip's shadow touches the summer solstice gnomonic line (1), which reveals the direction of true north (2). The traveller then turns the horizontal directional pin five compass points to the west for NWbW, and adjusts course to match the direction of the pin (3).

In 1984, Norwegian author and explorer Ragnar Thorseth led an international expedition in a replica of a Norse merchant ship, the Saga Siglar. For the passage between Iceland and Greenland, the crew had been given replicas of the Uunartoq disc to test against the ship's modern magnetic compass, and the deviation between the two was described as "negligible" and "...results were far better than the navigators had expected..."

== Possible use as latitude reader ==
In 2013, researchers from Eötvös University in Hungary argued that the Uunartoq disc could have also been used to determine a traveller's latitude. The researchers pointed to a series of very short inscribed lines stacked atop one another on the disc's north index mark, whereas gnomonic lines by necessity run from west to east across the sun compass's face. Under this theory, the disc's user would have made a reference point at the north index mark at high-noon just prior to departure and then made subsequent high-noon marks during the course of the journey, and compared these against their home's reference point. If the journey's marks were in the same position as the home reference point, it meant that the user had been maintaining a consistent latitude. A high-noon mark coming in below the home reference meant that one was further south (although travellers also would have had to make allowances for the constant seasonal changes of the sun's position at high-noon).

== Sólarsteinn ==
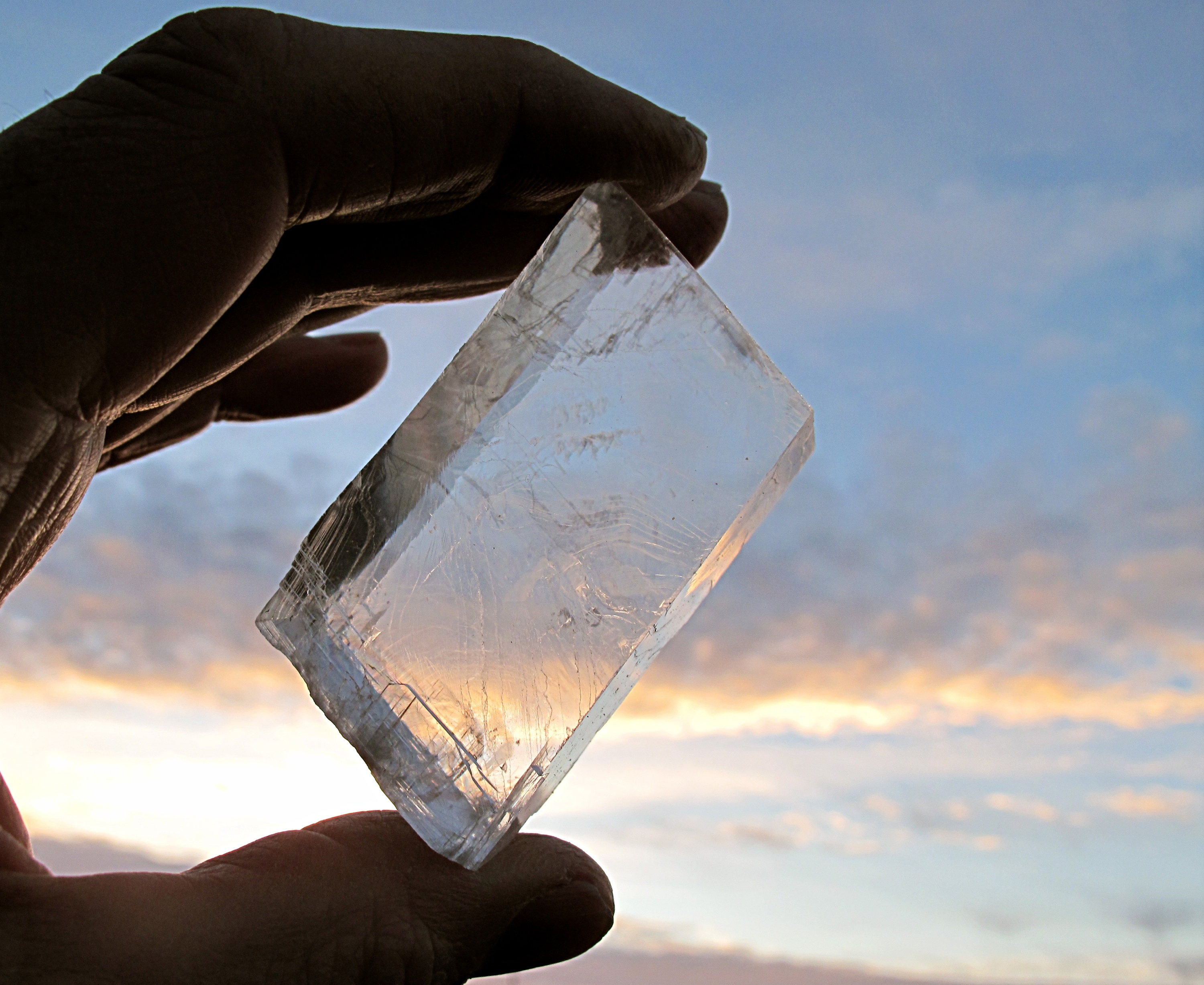
Iceland Spar

Whether the Norse used these sorts of devices primarily as compasses or latitude readers, both relied on the sun. It is believed that on overcast days, Norse mariners made use of a sun stone, likely clear Iceland Spar (Calcium Calcite) which can be used as a polarization analyzer to find the sun's position through the clouds. There are references to the possible Norse use of sun stones in two Icelandic Sagas; Hrafns saga Sveinbjarnarsonar ("The King looked about and saw no blue sky...then the King took the Sunstone and held it up, and then he saw where the Sun beamed from the stone") and the Saga of St. Olaf ("Olaf grabbed a Sunstone, looked at the sky and saw from where the light came, from which he guessed the position of the invisible Sun"). In addition to their work demonstrating the Uunartoq disc's possible use as a latitude reader, the Eötvös University researchers also argued that if the disc was used with a pair of sun stones, it might have been possible to detect true north up to 50 minutes after sunset, thus serving as a "twilight compass" as well. A 2018 study by different researchers at Eötvös found that "sky-polarimetric Viking navigation is surprisingly successful at spring equinox and summer solstice even in cloudy weather..."

== Appearance in popular culture ==
In the History Channel's television series Vikings, a sun compass very similar in appearance to the Uunartoq disc was a significant plot device in the first season, as it allowed the Norsemen to maintain a consistent latitude while sailing west on the open ocean to raid Britain, though it was shown floating in water rather than hand-held as envisioned by Sølver.
