= Pythagoras tree =

Pythagoras tree may refer to:

- Tree of primitive Pythagorean triples
- Pythagoras tree (fractal)
