= Pythagorean tree =

Pythagorean tree may refer to:

- Tree of primitive Pythagorean triples
- Pythagoras tree (fractal)
