= Sunstone (medieval) =

Ancient navigational aid

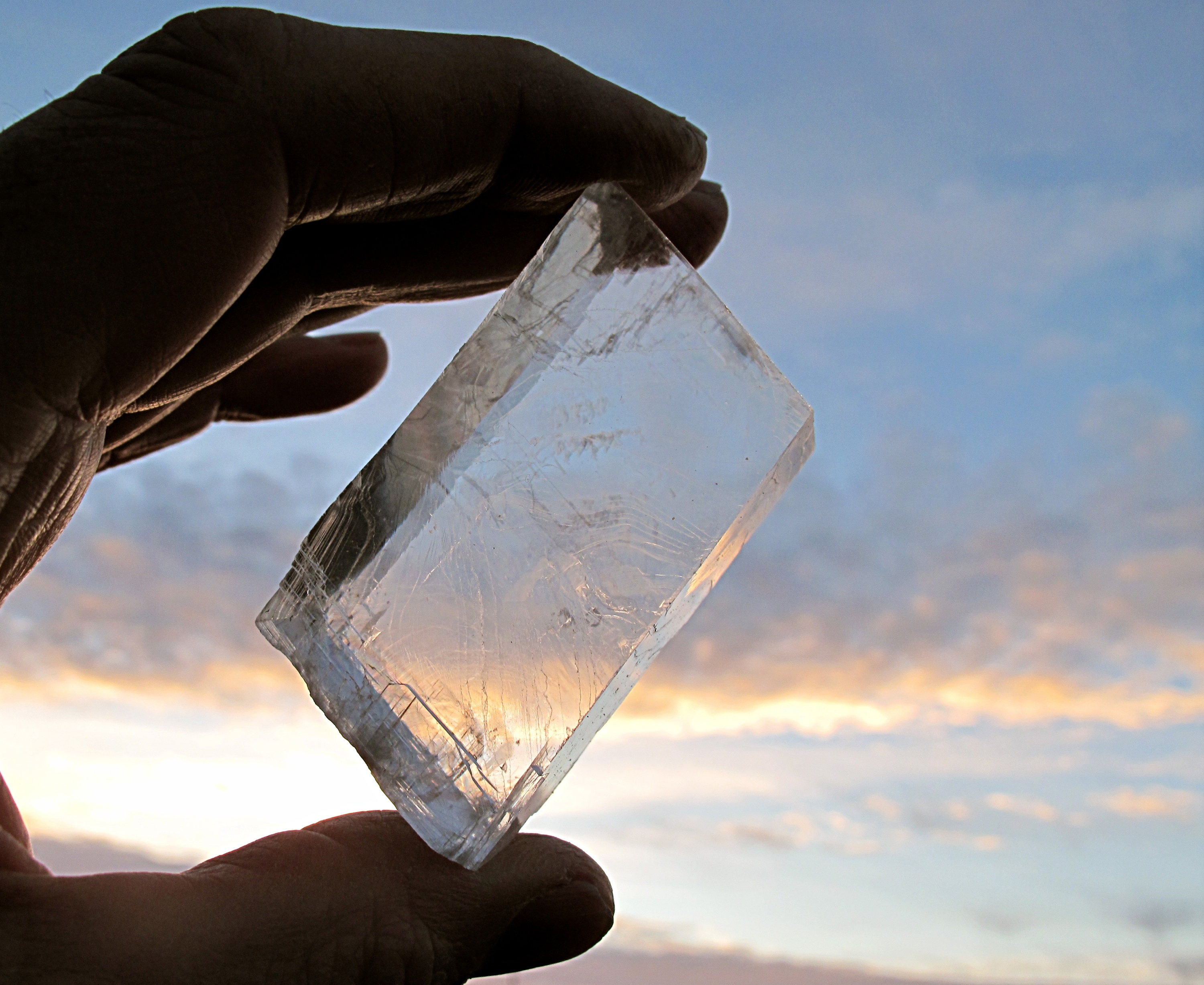
Iceland spar, possibly the medieval sunstone used to locate the Sun in the sky when clouds obstruct it from view

The sunstone (Icelandic: sólarsteinn) is a type of mineral attested in several 13th–14th-century written sources in Iceland, one of which describes its use to locate the Sun in a completely overcast sky. Sunstones are also mentioned in the inventories of several churches and one monastery in 14th–15th-century Iceland and Germany.

A hypothesis exists that the sunstone had polarizing attributes and was used as a navigational instrument by seafarers in the Viking Age. A stone found in 2002 off Alderney, in the wreck of a 16th-century warship, may lend evidence of the existence of sunstones as navigational devices.

== Sources ==
One medieval source in Iceland, Rauðúlfs þáttr, mentions the sunstone as a mineral by means of which the sun could be located in an overcast and snowy sky by holding it up and noting where it emitted, reflected or transmitted light (hvar geislaði úr honum). Sunstones are also mentioned in Hrafns saga Sveinbjarnarsonar (13th century) and in church and monastic inventories (14th–15th century) without discussing their attributes. The sunstone texts of Hrafns saga Sveinbjarnarsonar were copied to all four versions of the medieval hagiography Guðmundar saga góða.

Thorsteinn Vilhjalmsson translates the Icelandic description in Rauðúlfs þáttr of the use of the sunstone as follows:

Veður var þykkt og drífanda sem Sigurður hafði sagt. Þá lét konungur kalla til sín Sigurð og Dag. Síðan lét konungur sjá út og sá hvergi himin skýlausan. Þá bað hann Sigurð segja hvar sól mundi þá komin. Hann kvað glöggt á. Þá lét konungur taka sólarstein og hélt upp og sá hann hvar geislaði úr steininum og markaði svo beint til sem Sigurður hafði sagt.

Translation:

The weather was thick and snowy as Sigurður had predicted. Then the king summoned Sigurður and Dagur (Rauðúlfur's sons) to him. The king made people look out and they could nowhere see a clear sky. Then he asked Sigurður to tell where the sun was at that time. He gave a clear assertion. Then the king made them fetch the solar stone and held it up and saw where light radiated from the stone and thus directly verified Sigurður's prediction.

== Allegorical nature of the medieval texts ==
Two of the original medieval texts on the sunstone are allegorical. Hrafns saga Sveinbjarnarsonar contains a burst of purely allegorical material associated with Hrafn's slaying. This involves a celestial vision with three highly cosmological knights, recalling the horsemen of the Apocalypse. It has been suggested that the horsemen of Hrafns saga contain allegorical allusions to the winter solstice and the four elements as an omen of Hrafn's death, where the sunstone also appears.

"Rauðúlfs þáttr", a tale of Saint Olav, and the only medieval source mentioning how the sunstone was used, is a thoroughly allegorical work. A round and rotating house visited by Olav has been interpreted as a model of the cosmos and the human soul, as well as a prefiguration of the Church. The intention of the author was to achieve an apotheosis of St. Olav, through placing him in the symbolic seat of Christ. The house belongs to the genre of "abodes of the sun," which seemed widespread in medieval literature. St. Olav used the sunstone to confirm the time reckoning skill of his host right after leaving this allegorical house. He held the sunstone up against the snowy and completely overcast sky and noted where light was emitted from it (the Icelandic words used do not make it clear whether the light was reflected by the stone, emitted by it or transmitted through it). It has been suggested that in "Rauðúlfs þáttr" the sunstone was used as a symbol of the Virgin, following a widespread tradition in which the virgin birth of Christ is compared with glass letting a ray of the sun through.

The allegories of the above-mentioned texts exploit the symbolic value of the sunstone, but the church and monastic inventories, however, show that something called sunstones did exist as physical objects in Iceland. The presence of the sunstone in "Rauðúlfs þáttr" may be entirely symbolic but its use is described in sufficient detail to show that the idea of using a stone to find the sun's position in overcast conditions was commonplace.

== Possibility of use for orientation and navigation ==
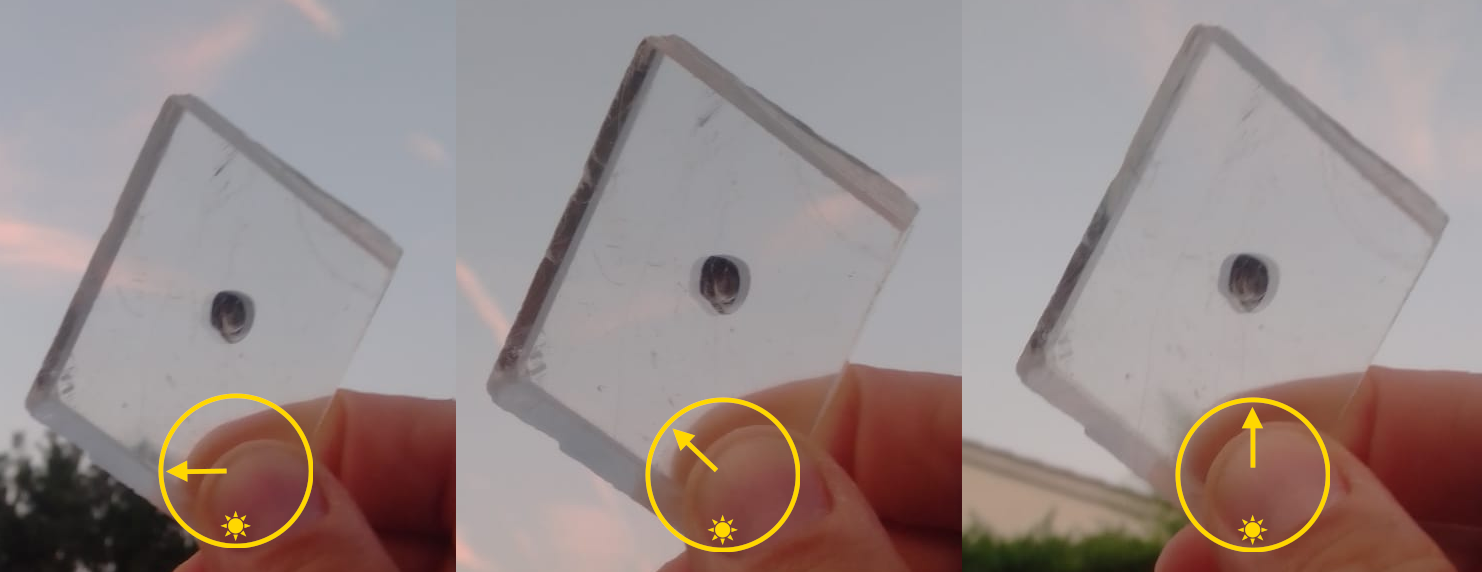
Demonstration of a sunstone used to locate the sun's position by comparing the intensity of the ordinary and extraordinary images of a black dot marked on the crystal's surface opposite the observer.

Danish archaeologist Thorkild Ramskou posited that the "sunstone" could have been one of the minerals (cordierite or Iceland spar) that polarize light and by which the azimuth of the sun can be determined in a partly overcast sky or when the sun is just below the horizon. The principle is used by some insects. Polarization is a phenomenon that occurs when light encounters an obstacle, such as a shiny surface or a fog bank, deviating to a particular orientation. Bees, for example, are known to be able to detect the polarization of the sunlight. Polar flights applied the idea before more advanced techniques became available. Ramskou further conjectured that Iceland spar could have aided navigation in the open sea in the Viking period. This idea has become very popular, and research as to how a "sunstone" could be used in nautical navigation continues, often in the context of the Uunartoq disc.

Research in 2011 proposes two techniques for using Iceland spar to estimate the direction of polarization of sky light and, by proxy, the direction towards the obscured sun. In the first process one looks at a patch of clear sky through a properly oriented crystal, then the crystal is quickly removed so that one can see with a naked eye a faint blue-yellow entoptic pattern that shows the polarization direction. Here the role of the crystal is to temporarily remove the natural polarization of the sky light, so that when the crystal is removed, the pattern is more easily seen by the contrast. This method was tested to estimate the direction towards the sun to within $\pm 5^\circ$ in twilight conditions. In the second method an obstacle (or an aperture) is placed on the farther side of the crystal and the crystal is rotated until both (the ordinary and extraordinary) images appear to have the same brightness. This allows estimate the polarization of the background sky as the bisector between the ordinary and extraordinary axes of the crystal. This method is estimated to have precision of $\pm 1^\circ$ if there is a patch of clear sky at $\approx 90^\circ$ to the sun, or under $\pm 10^\circ$ for lower polarization of 0.08 that stands for a cloudy sky. Attempts to replicate this work in both Scotland and off the coast of Turkey by science journalist Matt Kaplan and mineralogists at the British Geological Survey in 2014 failed. Kaplan communicated with Ropars, and neither could understand why the samples of Iceland spar that were being used during the trials did not reveal the sun's direction, with the author hypothesizing that the stones require some experience to be handled effectively.

The recovery of a piece of Iceland spar from an Elizabethan ship that sank near Alderney in 1592 suggests the possibility that this navigational technology may have persisted after the invention of the magnetic compass. Although the stone was found near a navigational instrument, its use remains uncertain.

Beyond nautical navigation, a polarizing crystal would have been useful as a sundial, especially at high latitudes with extended hours of twilight, in mountainous areas, or in partly overcast conditions. This would have required the polarizing crystal to be used in conjunction with known landmarks. Churches and monasteries would have valued such an object as an aid to keep track of the canonical hours.

A Hungarian team proposed that a sun compass artifact with crystals might also have allowed Vikings to guide their boats at night. A type of crystal they called sunstone can use scattered sunlight from below the horizon as a guide. What they suggest is that Iceland spar crystals were used in combination with Haidinger's brush. If so, Vikings could have used them in the northern latitudes where it never becomes completely dark in summer. In areas of confused magnetic deviation (such as the Labrador coast), a sunstone could have been a more reliable guide than a magnetic compass.

== See also ==
- Allegory in the Middle Ages
- Pfund sky compass
- Solar compass
