= Helgustaðir mine =

Protected area in Iceland

Coordinates: 65.0336°N 13.8526°W

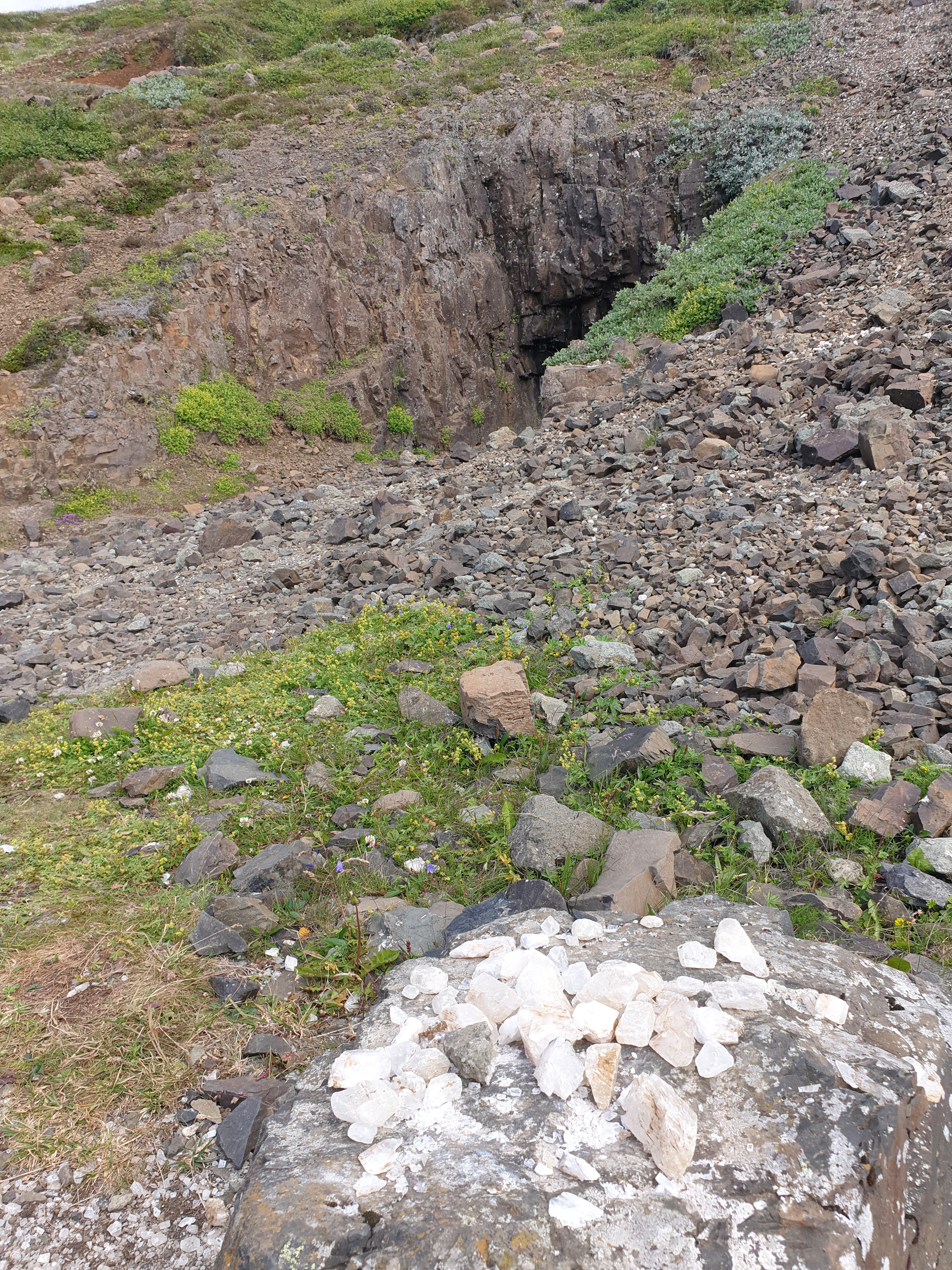
Helgustadir mine

Helgustaðir mine (Icelandic: Helgustaðanáma [ˈhɛlkʏˌstaːðaˌnauːma]) is a mine in the east of Iceland where Iceland spar (a form of transparent calcite) was mined from the mid-17th century to the 20th century. It is the source of the largest and clearest known Iceland spar specimen and the source of most museum specimens of Iceland spar.

It was declared a nature reserve in 1975.

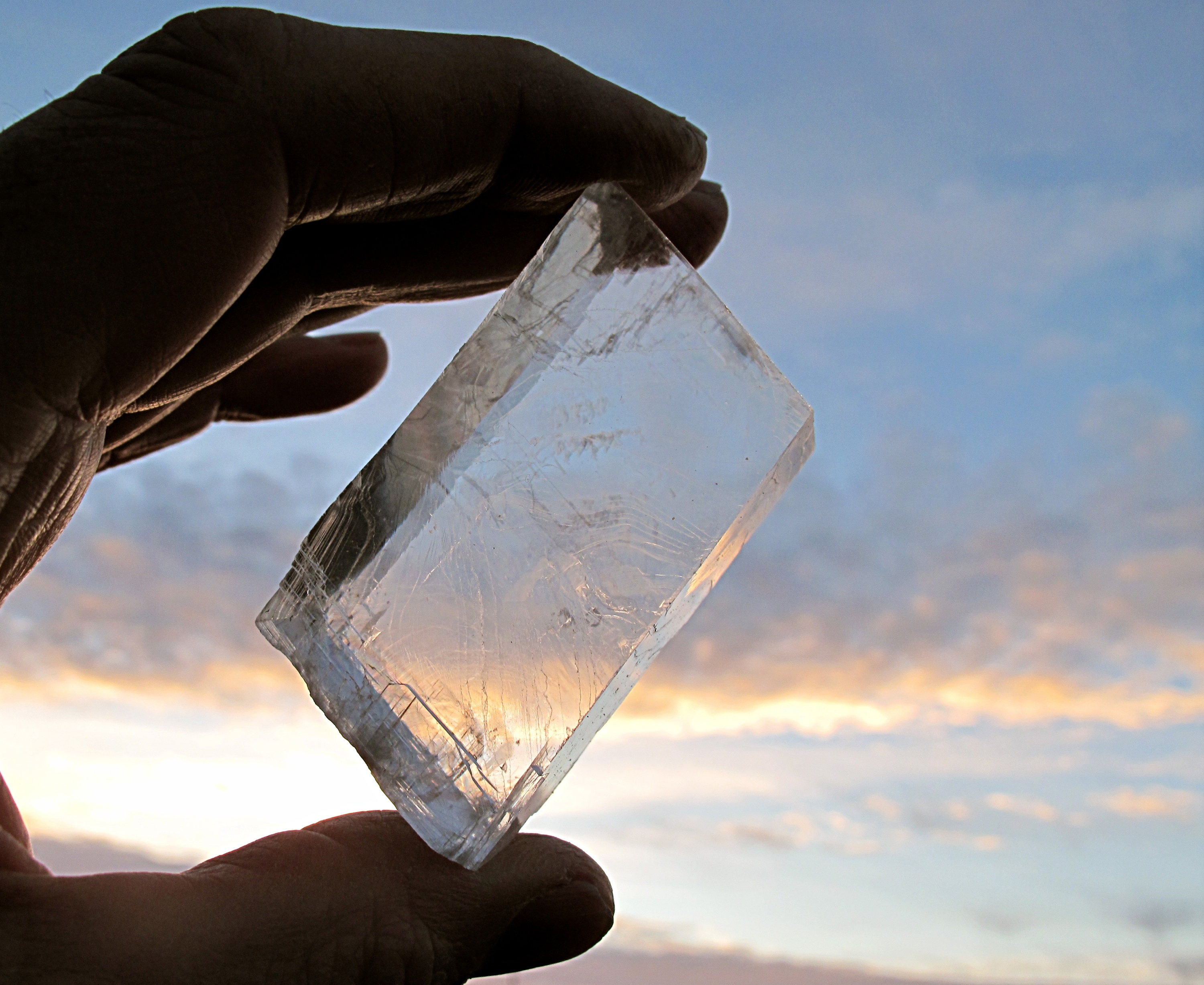

== About ==
=== Location ===
Helgustadir mine is close to Eskifjörður.

The mine is located near Eskifjörður, in the east of Iceland. Helgustaðir mine consists of two mines, known as the upper and lower mine.

=== Uses ===
Crystals from this area are known for exceptional clarity, leading to the mineral being named "Iceland spar".

Iceland spar from Helgustaðir mine was used in optical devices used in physics, chemistry, and geology, most importantly Nicol prisms.

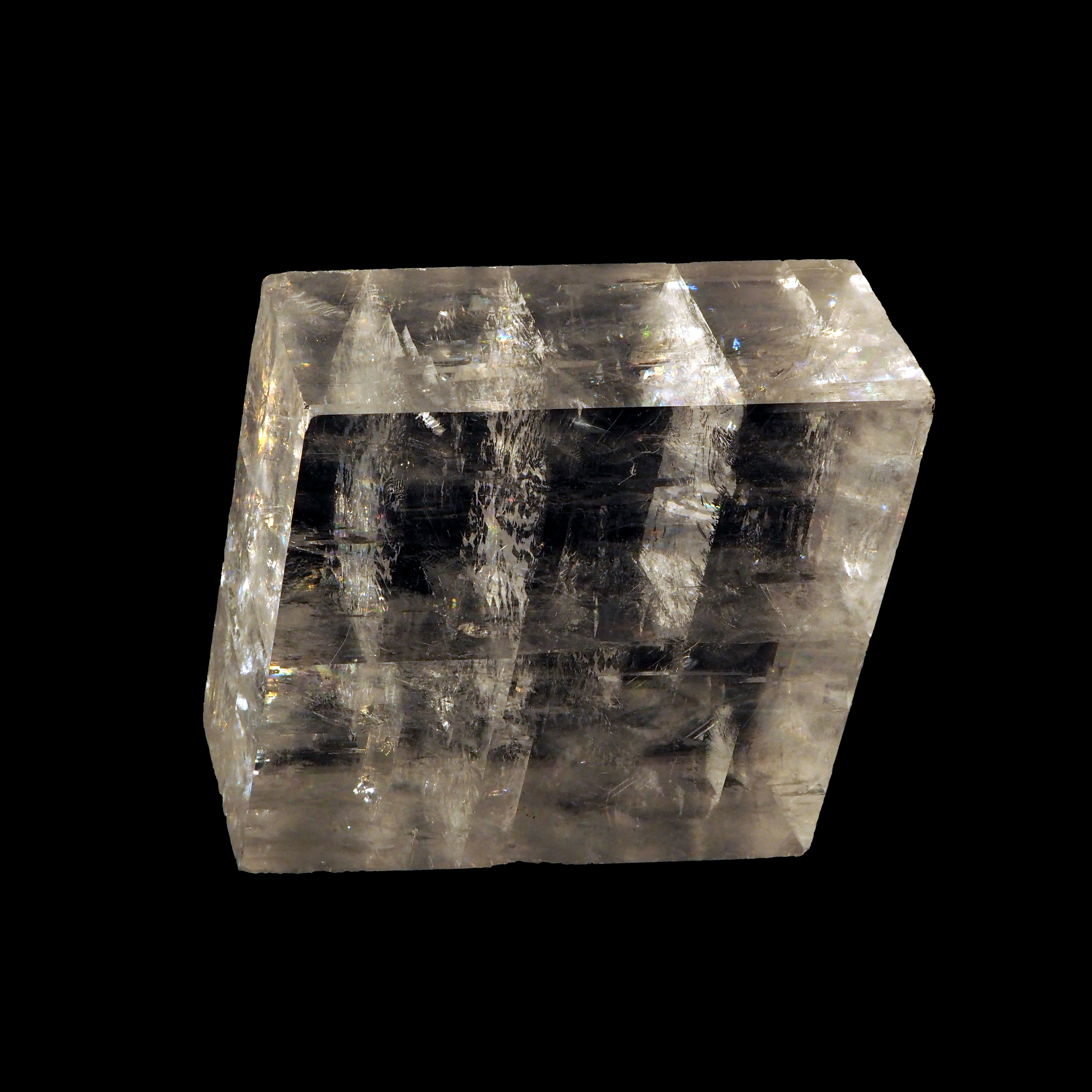

=== Nature reserve ===
The nature reserve is 0.9 hectares. Since 2010, it has been on the Environment Agency of Iceland's red list of areas that are likely to lose their protection status.

== Theft of crystals ==
Being a nature reserve, tampering with the rock formations and removing crystals is forbidden. Despite that, visitors often take samples with them, causing a disruption of the area. The problem has gotten worse as tourism has increased, with some visitors filling their backpacks with samples.
