= Iceland spar =

Transparent variety of calcite

Iceland spar, formerly called Iceland crystal (Icelandic: silfurberg [ˈsɪlvʏrˌpɛrk], lit. 'silver-rock') and also called optical calcite, is a transparent variety of calcite, a crystallized calcium carbonate, originally brought from Iceland and used in demonstrating the polarization of light.

== Formation and composition ==
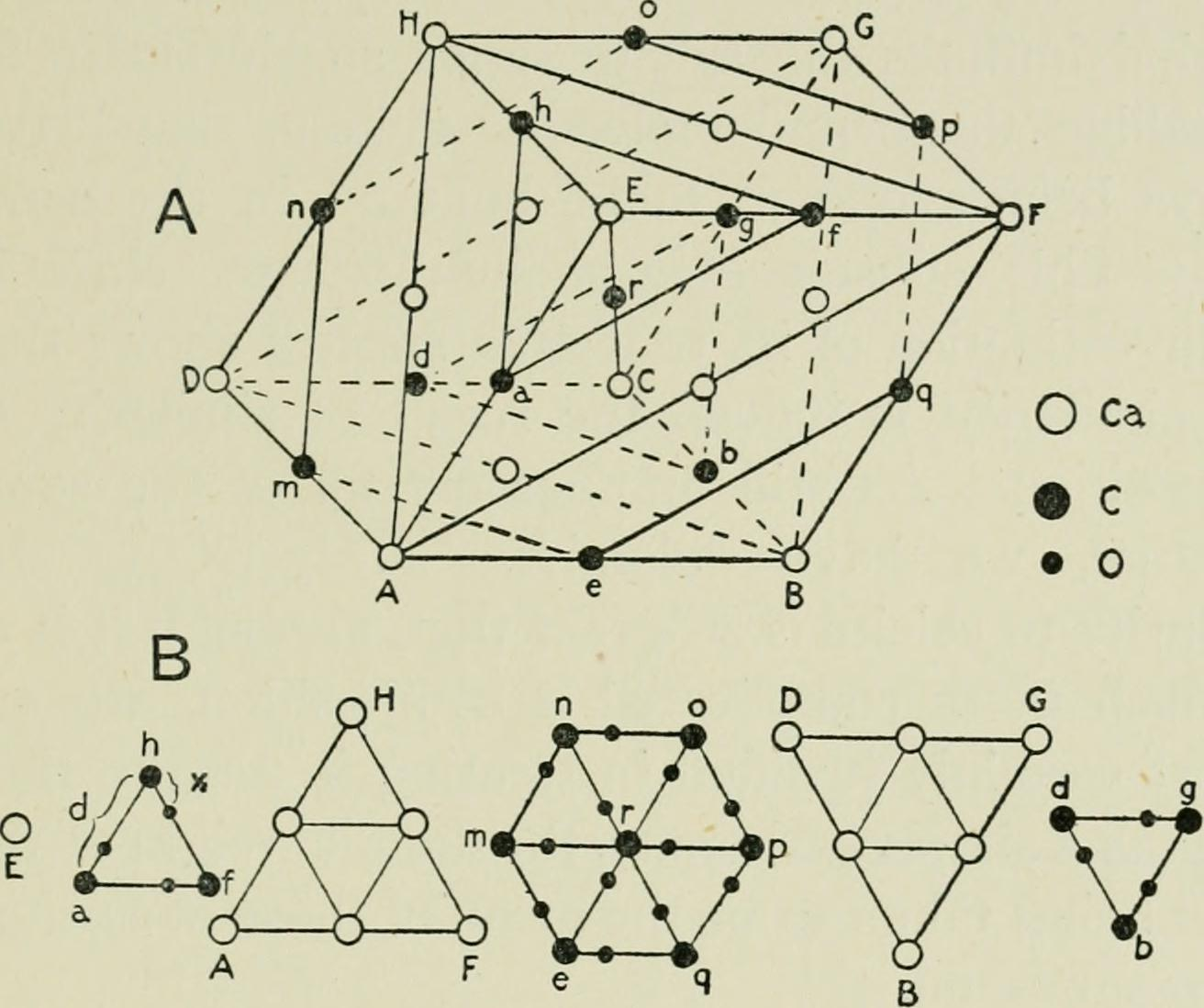
Calcite rhombohedral crystal structure

Iceland spar is a colourless, transparent variety of calcium carbonate (CaCO_{3}). It crystallizes in the trigonal system, typically forming rhombohedral crystals. It has a Mohs hardness of 3 and exhibits double refraction, splitting a ray of light into two rays that travel at different speeds and directions.

Iceland spar forms in sedimentary environments, mainly limestone and dolomite rocks, but also in hydrothermal veins and evaporite deposits. It precipitates from solutions rich in calcium and carbonate ions, influenced by temperature, pressure, and impurities.

The most common crystal structure of Iceland spar is rhombohedral, but other structures, such as scalenohedral or prismatic, can form depending on formation conditions. Iceland spar is primarily found in Iceland but can occur in different parts of the world with suitable geological conditions.

== Characteristics and optical properties ==
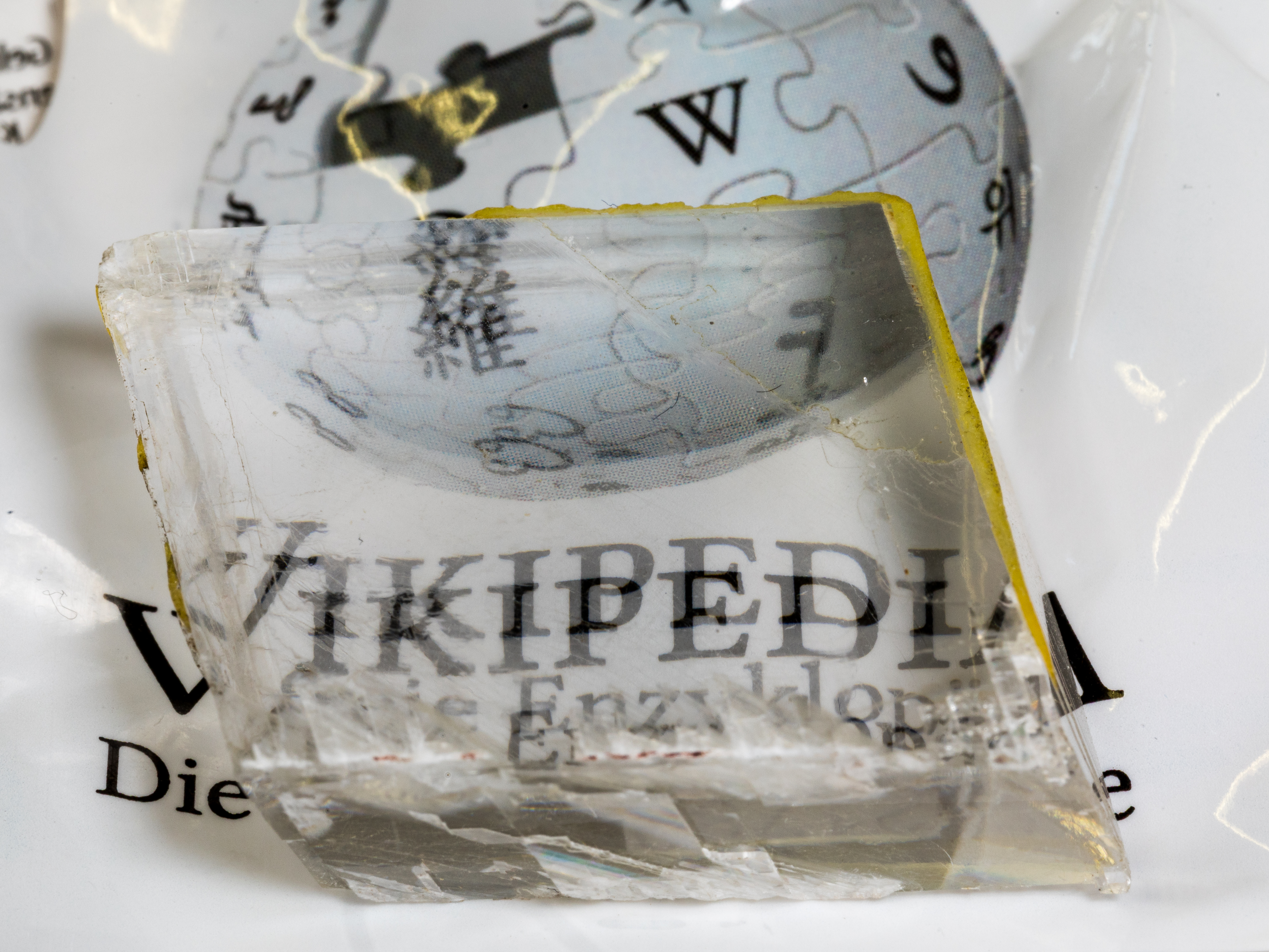
Calcite crystal birefringence

Iceland spar is characterized by its large, readily cleavable crystals, easily divided into parallelepipeds. This feature makes it easily identifiable and workable.

Iceland spar possesses remarkable optical properties:

- It is highly transparent to visible light, which passes through with minimal absorption or scattering, ideal for optical applications requiring clarity.
- It is birefringent, whereby its refractive index differs for light of different polarizations. When a ray of unpolarized light passes through the crystal, it is divided into two rays of mutually perpendicular polarization directed at various angles. This double refraction causes objects seen through the crystal to appear doubled, and the crystal can produce vivid colours when viewed under polarized light. This effect is known as the "Becke line" and can be used to determine a mineral's refractive index.
- It is optically active, meaning it can rotate the plane of polarization of light passing through it, a property resulting from its asymmetric atomic arrangement.

These optical properties contribute to the mineral's scientific use and aesthetic appeal.

== Historical significance ==
Iceland spar holds historical importance in optics and the study of light. That it exhibits double refraction was first described by the Danish scientist Erasmus Bartholin in 1669.

The study of Iceland spar's double refraction by scientists including Christiaan Huygens, Isaac Newton, and Sir George Stokes played a role in developing the wave theory of light. Huygens, in particular, used double refraction to support his wave theory of light, in contrast to Newton's corpuscular theory. Augustin-Jean Fresnel published a complete explanation of double refraction in light polarization in the 1820s.

The understanding of double refraction in Iceland spar led to the development of polarized light microscopy, used to study the properties of materials.

It is speculated Vikings used its light-polarizing property to tell the direction of the sun on cloudy days for navigational purposes.

== Mining ==
Named after Iceland due to its abundance on the island, Iceland spar occurs in locations worldwide including many mines producing related calcite and aragonite. Sources include China, the greater Sonoran Desert region of North America, Chihuahua, Mexico, and New Mexico, United States. The clearest specimens, as well as the single largest, are from the Helgustaðir mine in Iceland.

The mining process for Iceland spar varies based on the specific geological conditions of the deposit. Open-pit mining or quarrying is common for surface deposits. Once extracted, the calcite is processed to remove impurities and prepared for applications including optical instruments and jewelry, and as a source of calcium carbonate for industrial use.

=== Environmental issues ===
Some potential environmental issues associated with Iceland spar mining include habitat destruction, water pollution, air pollution, soil degradation, and visual impact. Mining activities can destroy natural habitats, mainly if the mining site is located in ecologically sensitive areas, leading to the loss of biodiversity and disrupting local ecosystems. Water sources can be contaminated through the discharge of chemicals used in the extraction and processing of minerals, impacting aquatic life and water quality. Mining activities can also lead to soil erosion and degradation, mainly if proper land reclamation measures are not implemented after mining ceases. Open-pit mining operations can have a significant visual impact on the landscape, altering the natural scenery of an area. These measures may include erosion control, environmentally friendly mining techniques, and the reclamation of mined areas to restore them to a natural state.

== Uses ==
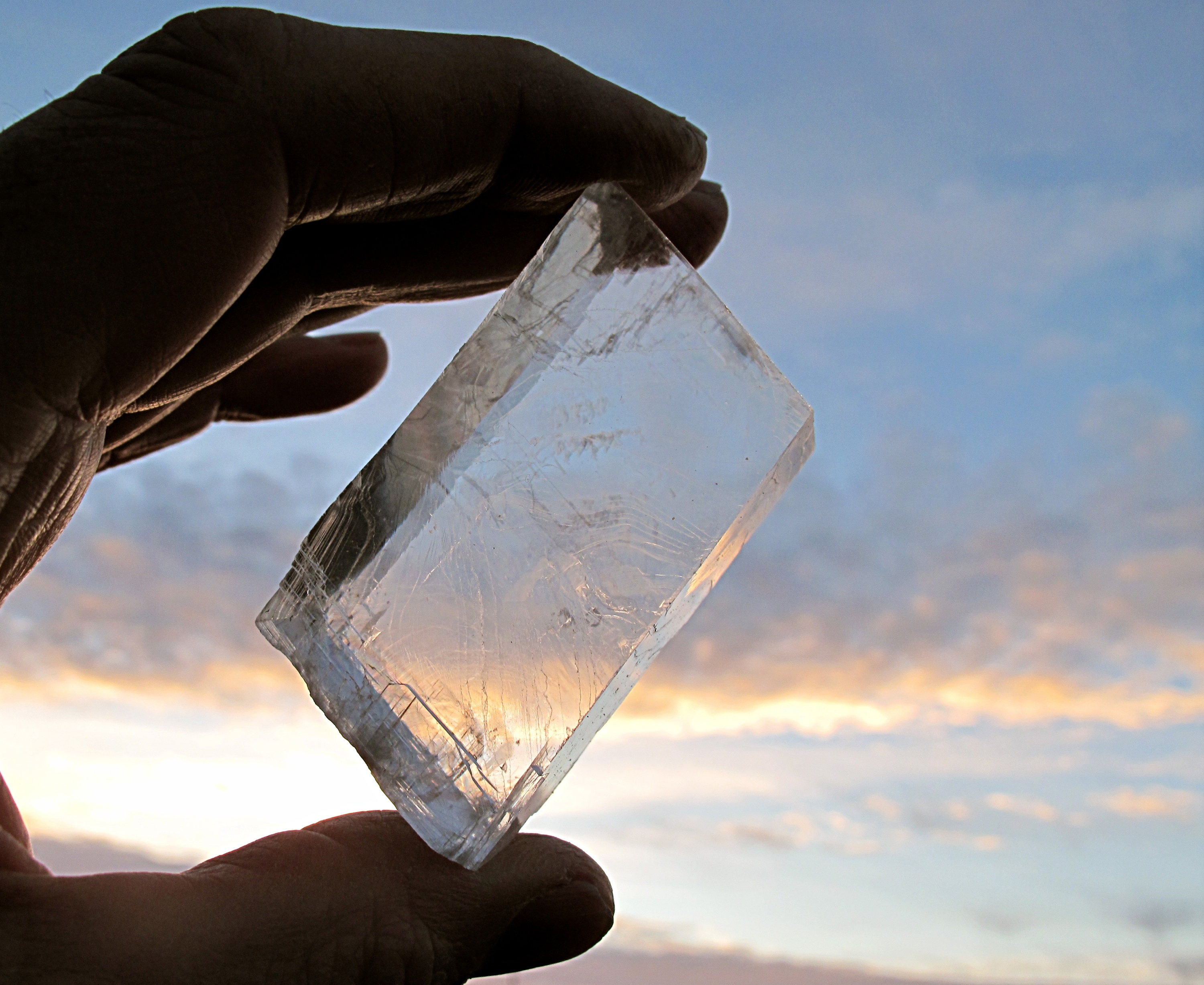
Iceland spar, possibly the Icelandic medieval sun stone used to locate the sun's direction in overcast or foggy skies

=== Historical applications ===
Iceland spar's unique optical properties made it historically useful in applications including telecommunications, polarizing microscopes, optical rangefinders, and gunsights. It has been used in navigation as a polarizing filter to determine the sun's direction on overcast and foggy days. It is speculated that the sunstone (Old Norse: sólarsteinn, a different mineral from the gem-quality sunstone) mentioned in medieval Icelandic texts, such as Rauðúlfs þáttr, was Iceland spar, and that Vikings used its light-polarizing property to tell the direction of the sun on cloudy days for navigational purposes. The polarization of sunlight in the Arctic can be detected, and the direction of the sun identified to within a few degrees in both cloudy and twilight conditions using the sunstone and the naked eye. The process involves moving the stone across the visual field to reveal a yellow entoptic pattern on the fovea of the eye, probably Haidinger's brush. The recovery of an Iceland spar sunstone from a ship of the Elizabethan era that sank in 1592 off Alderney suggests that this navigational technology may have persisted after the invention of the magnetic compass.

William Nicol (1770–1851) used Iceland spar to invent the first polarizing prism, the Nicol prism.

=== Modern applications ===
Iceland spar holds an essential place in modern applications including polarizing microscopes, lenses, and filters. Its birefringence in geological and biological microscopy reveals material structure, and in education and research it is a practical tool to demonstrate optical principles.

As a calcite, Iceland spar is used as a building material in cement and concrete. Its high purity and brightness make it an ideal filler in paints and coatings. In metallurgy, calcite acts as a flux to lower the melting point of metals during smelting and refining. It is used in agriculture as a soil conditioner and neutralizer to adjust soil pH levels and improve crop yields. Calcite contributes to environmental remediation efforts, treating water and soil by neutralizing acidity and removing heavy metals.

=== Geological significance ===
Due to Iceland spar typically forming in sedimentary environments, particularly limestone and dolomite rocks, its formation is closely tied to these carbonate rocks' deposition and diagenesis (compaction and cementation). Studying Iceland spar distribution can provide information about past environmental conditions, such as the presence of ancient seas and marine life, as carbonate rocks like limestone often form in marine environments. The presence of Iceland spar can indicate hydrothermal activity, as calcite can form in hydrothermal veins.

== Conservation and protection ==
Conservation efforts related to Iceland spar primarily focus on preserving specimens and mining sites. One challenge in preserving specimens is the risk of damage during extraction, handling, and storage. Mining sites that yield high-quality specimens are of interest for conservation and may be designated protected areas to prevent overexploitation.

== In popular culture ==
The Thomas Pynchon novel Against the Day uses the doubling effect of Iceland spar as a theme.

== See also ==
- Spar sunstone
