= Jacques Ozanam =

French mathematician (1640–1718)

- Born: 16 June 1640; Sainte-Olive, Province of Burgundy
- Died: 3 April 1718 (aged 77); Paris
- Occupation: Mathematician

Jacques Ozanam (16 June 1640 – 3 April 1718) was a French mathematician.

== Biography ==
Jacques Ozanam was born in Sainte-Olive, Ain, France.

In 1670, he published trigonometric and logarithmic tables more accurate than the existing ones of Ulacq, Pitiscus, and Briggs. An act of kindness in lending money to two strangers brought him to the attention of M. d'Aguesseau, father of the chancellor, and he secured an invitation to settle in Paris. There he enjoyed prosperity and contentment for many years. He married, had a large family, and derived an ample income from teaching mathematics to private pupils, chiefly foreigners.

His mathematical publications were numerous and well received. Récréations (published 1694) was later translated into English and is well known today. He was elected a member of the Académie des Sciences in 1701. The death of his wife plunged him into deep sorrow, and the loss of his foreign pupils through the War of the Spanish Succession reduced him to poverty. He died in Paris on April 3, 1718 (frequently cited as 1717 because of an error in "éloge de Fontenelle").

Ozanam was honoured worldwide for his contributions towards mathematics.

He taught Abraham de Moivre.

== Selected works ==
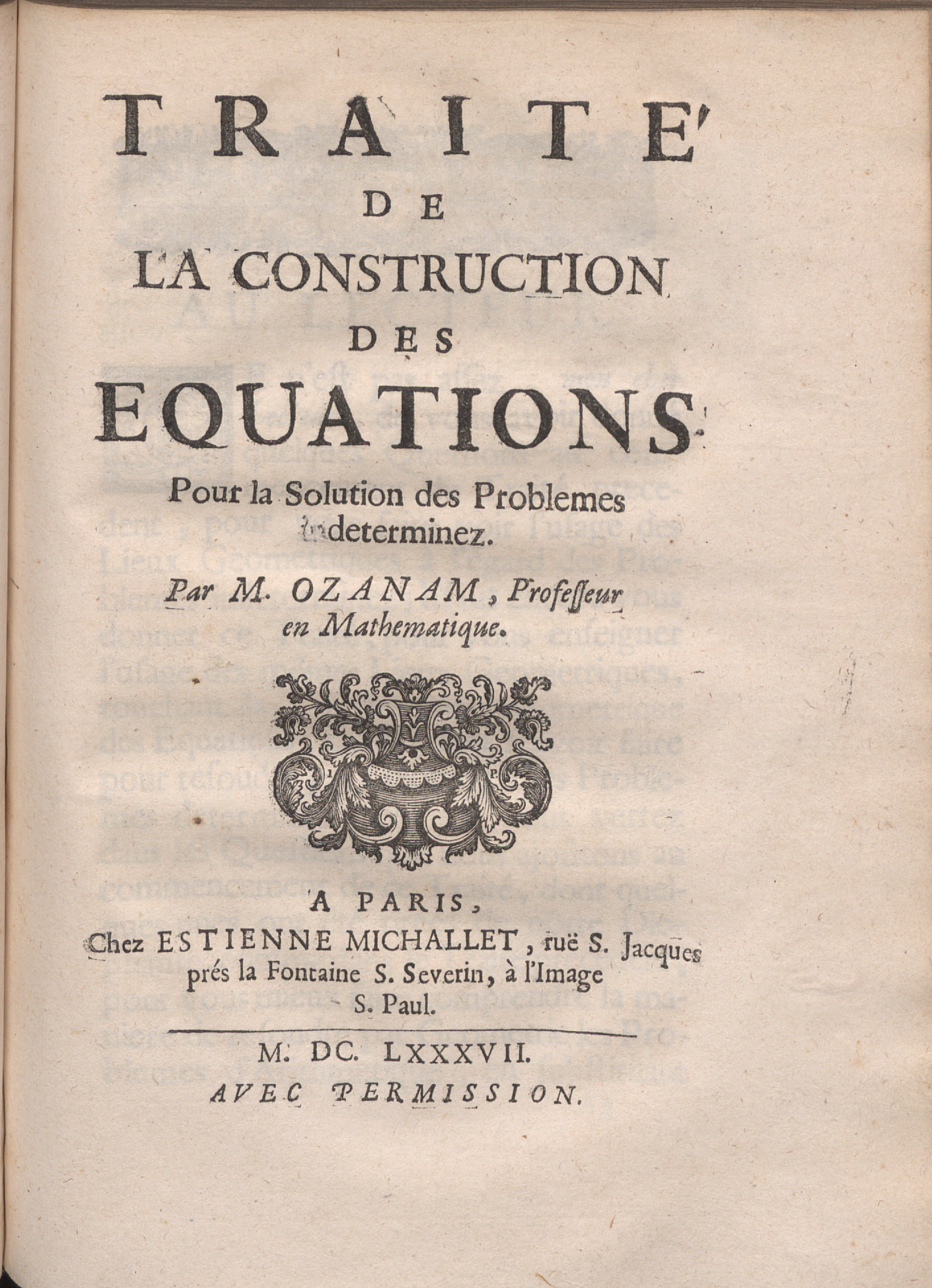
Traité de la construction des equations pour la solution des problemes indeterminez, 1687

- Table des sinus, tangentes, et sécantes (1670)
- Methode générale pour tracer des cadrans (1673)
- Geometrie pratique (1684)
- Traité des lignes du premier genre (1687)
- Traité des lieux geometriques (in French). Paris: Estienne Michallet. 1687.
- De l'usage du compas (1688)
- Dictionnaire mathématique (1691)
- Cours de mathématiques (Paris, 1693, 5 vols, tr. into English, London, 1712)
- Traité de la fortification (Paris, 1694)
- Récréations mathématiques et physiques (1694, 2 vols, revised by Montucla in 1778, 4 vols)
- Nouvelle Trigonométrie (1698)
- Méthode facile pour arpenter (1699)
- Nouveaux Éléments d'Algèbre (1702)
- La Géographie et Cosmographie (1711)
- La Perspective (1711).

== See also ==
- VIII. Formulas for Generating Pythagorean Triples

== Sources ==
Ozanam, Jacques, (1844). Science and Natural Philosophy: Dr. Hutton’s Translation of Montucla’s edition of Ozanam, revised by Edward Riddle, Thomas Tegg, London. Read online- Cornell University
