= Jean-Étienne Montucla =

French mathematician and historian (1725–1799)

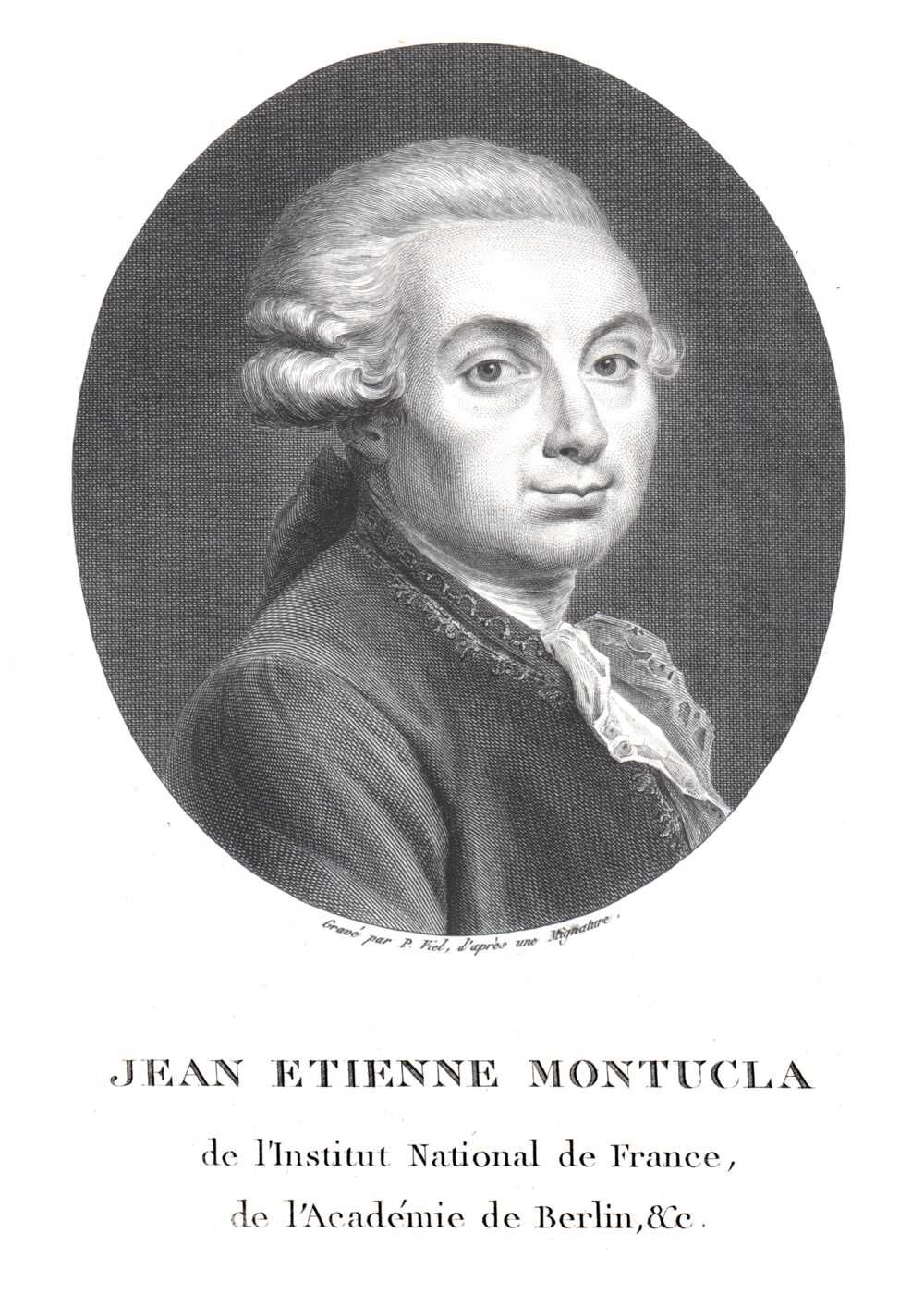
- Born: 5 September 1725; Lyon, France
- Died: 18 December 1799 (aged 74); Versailles, Yvelines, France
- Known for: Histoire des Mathématiques

Signature
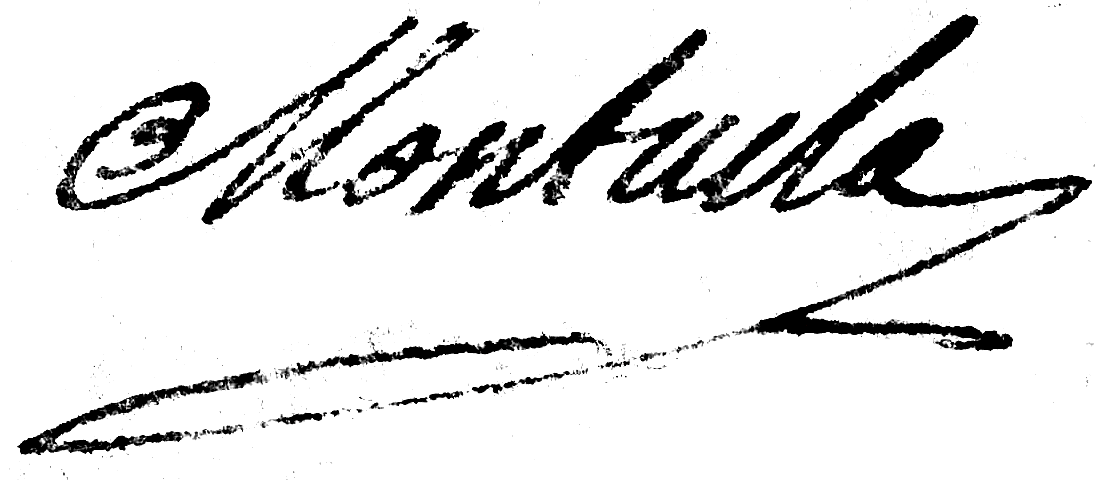

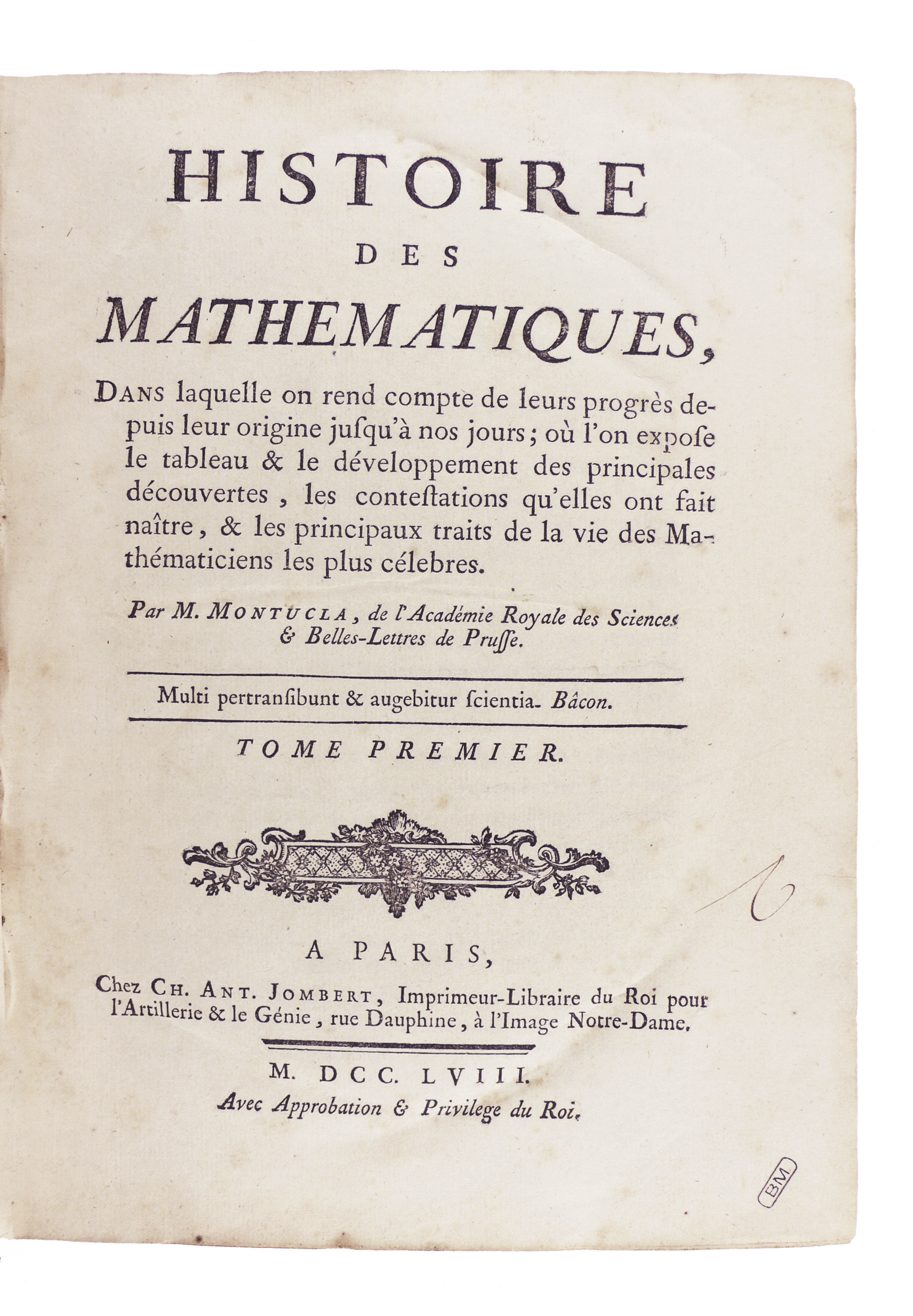
Histoire des mathématiques, 1758.

Jean-Étienne Montucla (5 September 1725 – 18 December 1799) was a French mathematician and historian.

Montucla was born at Lyon, France.

In 1754 he published an anonymous treatise on quadrature, Histoire des recherches sur la quadrature du cercle. Montucla's deep interest in history of mathematics became apparent with his publication of Histoire des Mathématiques, the first part appearing in 1758. According to George Sarton, the Histoire is

a history of the mathematical sciences, and might almost be called a history of science from the mathematical angle, even as many histories of medicine are to some extent histories of science written from the medical angle.

He was appointed intendant-secretary of Grenoble in 1758, secretary to the expedition for colonizing Cayenne in 1764, and chief architect and censor-royal for mathematical books in 1765. In 1778 he re-edited Jacques Ozanam's Recreations mathématiques, afterwards published in English by Charles Hutton (4 vols, London, 1803).

The French Revolution deprived him of his income and left him in great destitution. The offer in 1795 of a mathematical chair in one of the schools of Paris was declined on account of his infirm health. He was still in dire circumstances in 1798, when he published a second edition of the first part of his Histoire. After his death, his Histoire was completed by Jérôme Lalande, and published at Paris in 1799–1802 (4 vols).

Ivor Grattan-Guinness described the Histoire as a milestone:

His first volume covered Greek, Roman, and Eastern traditions, while the second covered geometry, mechanics and optics up to the seventeenth century. Forty years later the second edition began to appear, although the author then died and task of completion fell to Jérôme Lalande. With the help of various colleagues, he completed the third volume and wrote the fourth within four years. The first two volumes covered the same material as before, while the other two handled all aspects of the eighteenth century; the whole encompassed around 3000 pages, including indexes (themselves an excellent feature)...One curious feature of the work, especially in chapters on applied mathematics, is the lack of mathematical symbolism in the text: Montucla and Lalande were often content with a verbal account of the work without entering into symbolic renderings. Of course many basic aspects of the history of mathematics were thus left out.
