= Outline of geometry =

Overview of and topical guide to geometry

Geometry is a branch of mathematics concerned with questions of shape, size, relative position of figures, and the properties of space. Geometry is one of the oldest mathematical sciences. Modern geometry also extends into non-Euclidean spaces, topology, and fractal dimensions, bridging pure mathematics with applications in physics, computer science, and data visualization.

== Types, methodologies, and terminologies of geometry ==
- Absolute geometry
- Affine geometry
- Algebraic geometry
- Analytic geometry
- Birational geometry
- Complex geometry
- Computational geometry
- Conformal geometry
- Constructive solid geometry
- Contact geometry
- Convex geometry
- Descriptive geometry
- Differential geometry
- Digital geometry
- Discrete geometry
- Distance geometry
- Elliptic geometry
- Enumerative geometry
- Epipolar geometry
- Euclidean geometry
- Finite geometry
- Fractal geometry
- Geometry of numbers
- Hyperbolic geometry
- Incidence geometry
- Information geometry
- Integral geometry
- Inversive geometry
- Inversive ring geometry
- Klein geometry
- Lie sphere geometry
- Non-Euclidean geometry
- Noncommutative algebraic geometry
- Noncommutative geometry
- Ordered geometry
- Parabolic geometry
- Plane geometry
- Projective geometry
- Quantum geometry
- Riemannian geometry
- Ruppeiner geometry
- Solid geometry
- Spherical geometry
- Symplectic geometry
- Synthetic geometry
- Systolic geometry
- Taxicab geometry
- Toric geometry
- Transformation geometry
- Tropical geometry

== General geometry concepts ==
=== General concepts ===
- Chirality
  - Handedness
  - Relative direction
  - Mirror image
- Coordinate-free treatment
- Four-dimensional space
- Infinitesimal transformation
- Geometric progression
- Geometric shape
- Pi
- Angular velocity
- Linear velocity
- De Moivre's theorem
- Similar triangles
- Unit circle
- Point
- Line and Ray
- Plane

=== Measurements ===
- Bearing
- Angle
- Degree
- Minute
- Radian
- Circumference
- Diameter

=== Trigonometric functions ===
- Trigonometric function
  - Asymptotes
  - Circular functions
  - Periodic functions
  - Law of cosines
  - Law of sines
  - Polar sine

=== Vectors ===
- Amplitude
- Dot product
- Norm (mathematics) (also known as magnitude)
- Position vector
- Scalar multiplication
- Vector addition
- Zero vector

=== Vector spaces and complex dimensions ===
- Complex plane
- Imaginary axis
- Linear interpolation
- One-to-one
- Orthogonal
- Polar coordinate system
- Pole
- Real axis
- Secant line
- Circular sector or "sector"
- Semiperimeter

=== Symmetry, shape and pattern ===
- Symmetry
- Shape
- Pattern
- Crystal system
- Frieze group
- Isometry
- Lattice
- Point group
- Point groups in two dimensions
- Point groups in three dimensions
- Space group
- Symmetry group
- Translational symmetry
- Wallpaper group

== Euclidean geometry foundations ==
- Hilbert's axioms
- Locus
- Line
- Line segment
- Parallel
- Angle
  - Concurrent lines
  - Adjacent angles
  - Central angle
  - Complementary angles
  - Inscribed angle
  - Internal angle
  - Supplementary angles
  - Angle trisection
- Congruence
  - Reflection
  - Rotation
  - Coordinate rotations and reflections
  - Translation
  - Glide reflection
- Similarity
  - Similarity transformation
  - Homothety
- Shear mapping

=== Euclidean plane geometry ===
- 2D computer graphics
- 2D geometric model
- Altitude
- Brahmagupta's formula
- Bretschneider's formula
- Compass and straightedge constructions
  - Squaring the circle
- Complex geometry
- Conic section
  - Focus
  - Circle
    - List of circle topics
    - Thales' theorem
    - Circumcircle
    - Concyclic
    - Incircle and excircles of a triangle
    - Orthocentric system
    - Monge's theorem
    - Power center
    - Nine-point circle
    - Circle points segments proof
    - Mrs. Miniver's problem
    - Isoperimetric theorem
    - Annulus
    - Ptolemaios' theorem
    - Steiner chain
  - Eccentricity
  - Ellipse
    - Semi-major axis
  - Hyperbola
  - Parabola
  - Matrix representation of conic sections
  - Dandelin spheres
- Curve of constant width
  - Reuleaux triangle
- Frieze group
- Golden angle
- Holditch's theorem
- Interactive geometry software
- Involutes
  - Goat grazing problem
- Parallel postulate
- Polygon
  - Star polygon
  - Pick's theorem
  - Shape dissection
  - Bolyai–Gerwien theorem
  - Poncelet–Steiner theorem
  - Polygon triangulation
- Pons asinorum
- Quadrilateral
  - Bicentric quadrilateral
  - Cyclic quadrilateral
  - Equidiagonal quadrilateral
  - Kite (geometry)
  - Orthodiagonal quadrilateral
    - Rhombus
  - Rectangle
    - Square
  - Tangential quadrilateral
  - Trapezoid
    - Isosceles trapezoid
- Sangaku
- Straightedge
- Symmedian
- Tessellation
  - Prototile
  - Aperiodic tiling
    - Wang tile
    - Penrose tiling
- Trapezoid (trapezium)
  - Isosceles trapezoid
- Triangle
  - Acute and obtuse triangles
  - Equilateral triangle
  - Euler's line
  - Heron's formula
  - Integer triangle
    - Heronian triangle
  - Isosceles triangle
  - List of triangle inequalities
  - List of triangle topics
  - Pedal triangle
  - Pedoe's inequality
  - Pythagorean theorem
  - Pythagorean triangle
  - Right triangle
  - Triangle inequality
- Trigonometry
  - List of trigonometry topics
- Wallpaper group

=== 3-dimensional Euclidean geometry ===
- 3D projection
- 3D computer graphics
  - Binary space partitioning
  - Ray tracing
  - Graham scan
- Borromean rings
- Cavalieri's principle
- Cross section
- Crystal
- Cuisenaire rods
- Desargues' theorem
- Right circular cone
- Hyperboloid
- Napkin ring problem
- Pappus's centroid theorem
- Paraboloid
- Polyhedron
  - Defect
  - Dihedral angle
  - Prism
  - Prismatoid
  - Honeycomb
  - Pyramid
  - Parallelepiped
  - Tetrahedron
    - Heronian tetrahedron
  - Platonic solid
  - Archimedean solid
  - Kepler-Poinsot polyhedra
  - Johnson solid
  - Uniform polyhedron
  - Polyhedral compound
  - Hilbert's third problem
  - Deltahedron
  - Surface normal
- 3-sphere, spheroid, ellipsoid
  - Parabolic microphone
  - Parabolic reflector
- Soddy's hexlet
- Sphericon
- Stereographic projection
- Stereometry

=== n-dimensional Euclidean geometry ===
- Ball
- Convex
  - Convex hull
- Coxeter group
- Euclidean distance
- Homothetic center
- Hyperplane
- Lattice
  - Ehrhart polynomial
  - Leech lattice
  - Minkowski's theorem
- Packing
  - Sphere packing
    - Kepler conjecture
    - Kissing number problem
  - Honeycomb
    - Andreini tessellation
    - Uniform tessellation
    - Voronoi tessellation
    - Delaunay triangulation
    - Quasicrystal
- Parallelogram law
- Polytope
  - Schläfli symbol
  - Regular polytope
  - Regular Polytopes
- Sphere
- Quadric
  - Hypersphere, sphere
  - Spheroid
  - Ellipsoid
  - Hyperboloid
  - Paraboloid
  - Cone
- Torus
- Root system
- Similarity
- Zonotope

== Other geometries (not Euclidean) ==
- Projective geometry
  - Arc (projective geometry)
  - Desargues' theorem
  - Girard Desargues
  - Desarguesian plane
  - Line at infinity
  - Point at infinity
  - Plane at infinity
  - Hyperplane at infinity
  - Projective line
  - Projective plane
    - Oval (projective plane)
    - Roman surface
  - Projective space
  - Complex projective line
  - Complex projective plane
  - Fundamental theorem of projective geometry
  - Projective transformation
    - Möbius transformation
  - Cross-ratio
  - Duality
  - Homogeneous coordinates
  - Pappus's hexagon theorem
  - Incidence
  - Pascal's theorem
- Affine geometry
  - Affine space
  - Affine transformation
- Finite geometry
- Differential geometry
  - Contact geometry
  - Riemannian geometry
  - Symplectic geometry
- Non-Euclidean plane geometry
- Angle excess
- Hyperbolic geometry
  - Pseudosphere
  - Tractricoid
- Elliptic geometry
  - Spherical geometry
- Minkowski space
- Thurston's conjecture

== Numerical geometry ==
- Parametric curve
  - Bézier curve
  - Spline
    - Hermite spline
      - B-spline
    - NURBS
- Parametric surface

== Geometric algorithms ==
- Convex hull construction
- Euclidean shortest path
- Point in polygon
- Point location
- Hidden line removal

== History of geometry ==
History of geometry

- Timeline of geometry
- Babylonian geometry
- Egyptian geometry
- Ancient Greek geometry
  - Euclidean geometry
    - Pythagorean theorem
    - Euclid's Elements
    - Measurement of a Circle
- Indian mathematics
  - Bakhshali manuscript
- Modern geometry
  - History of analytic geometry
    - History of the Cartesian coordinate system
  - History of non-Euclidean geometry
  - History of topology
  - History of algebraic geometry
  - Erlangen program

== Generalizations ==
- Noncommutative geometry
- Topology

== Connections to other fields ==
- Mathematics and fiber arts
- Van Hiele model - Prevailing theory of how children learn to reason in geometry
- Astronomy
- Computer graphics
- Image analysis
- Robot control
- The Strähle construction is used in the design of some musical instruments.
- Burmester's theory for the design of mechanical linkages

== Lists ==
- List of mathematical shapes
- List of geometers
- List of curves
- List of curves topics
- List of trigonometric identities

== See also ==
- List of basic mathematics topics
- List of mathematics articles
- Table of mathematical symbols
