= Right kite =

Symmetrical quadrilateral

A right kite with its circumcircle and incircle. The leftmost and rightmost vertices have right angles.

In Euclidean geometry, a right kite is a kite (a quadrilateral whose four sides can be grouped into two pairs of equal-length sides that are adjacent to each other) that can be inscribed in a circle. That is, it is a kite with a circumcircle (i.e., a cyclic kite). Thus the right kite is a convex quadrilateral and has two opposite right angles. If there are exactly two right angles, each must be between sides of different lengths. All right kites are bicentric quadrilaterals (quadrilaterals with both a circumcircle and an incircle), since all kites have an incircle. One of the diagonals (the one that is a line of symmetry) divides the right kite into two right triangles and is also a diameter of the circumcircle. All right kites are harmonic quadrilaterals since they have a circumcircle and each pair of opposite sides has the same two lengths.

In a tangential quadrilateral (one with an incircle), the four line segments between the center of the incircle and the points where it is tangent to the quadrilateral partition the quadrilateral into four right kites.

== Special case ==
A special case of right kites are squares, where the diagonals have equal lengths, and the incircle and circumcircle are concentric.

== Characterizations ==
A kite is a right kite if and only if it has a circumcircle (by definition). This is equivalent to its being a kite with two opposite right angles.

== Metric formulas ==
Since a right kite can be divided into two right triangles, the following metric formulas easily follow from well known properties of right triangles. In a right kite ABCD where the opposite angles B and D are right angles, the other two angles can be calculated from
$$\tan{\frac{A}{2}}=\frac{b}{a},\qquad \tan{\frac{C}{2}}=\frac{a}{b}$$

where a = AB = AD and b = BC = CD. The area of a right kite is
$$\displaystyle K=ab.$$

The diagonal AC that is a line of symmetry has the length
$$p=\sqrt{a^2+b^2}$$

and, since the diagonals are perpendicular (so a right kite is an orthodiagonal quadrilateral with area $K=\frac{pq}{2}$), the other diagonal BD has the length
$$q=\frac{2ab}{\sqrt{a^2+b^2}}.$$

The radius of the circumcircle is (according to the Pythagorean theorem)
$$R=\tfrac12\sqrt{a^2+b^2}$$

and, since all kites are tangential quadrilaterals, the radius of the incircle is given by
$$r=\frac{K}{s}=\frac{ab}{a+b}$$

where s is the semiperimeter.

The area is given in terms of the circumradius R and the inradius r as
$$K=r(r+\sqrt{4R^2+r^2}).$$

If we take the segments extending from the intersection of the diagonals to the vertices in clockwise order to be $d_1$, $d_2$,$d_3$, and $d_4$, then,
$$d_1 d_3=d_2 d_4$$
This is a direct result of the geometric mean theorem.

== Duality ==
The dual polygon to a right kite is an isosceles tangential trapezoid.

== Alternative definition ==
Sometimes a right kite is defined as a kite with at least one right angle. If there is only one right angle, it must be between two sides of equal length; in this case, the formulas given above do not apply.
