= Apollonius quadrilateral =

Type of quadrilateral

An example of an Apollonius quadrilateral

In geometry, an Apollonius quadrilateral is a quadrilateral $ABCD$ such that the two products of opposite side lengths are equal. That is,
$$\overline{AB}\cdot\overline{CD}=\overline{AD}\cdot\overline{BC}.$$
An equivalent way of stating this definition is that the cross ratio of the four points is $\pm 1$. It is allowed for the quadrilateral sides to cross.

The Apollonius quadrilaterals are important in inversive geometry, because the property of being an Apollonius quadrilateral is preserved by Möbius transformations, and every continuous transformation of the plane that preserves all Apollonius quadrilaterals must be a Möbius transformation.

Every kite is an Apollonius quadrilateral. A special case of the Apollonius quadrilaterals are the harmonic quadrilaterals; these are cyclic Apollonius quadrilaterals, inscribed in a given circle. They may be constructed by choosing two opposite vertices $A$ and $C$ arbitrarily on the circle, letting $E$ be any point exterior to the circle on line $AC$, and setting $B$ and $D$ to be the two points where the circle is touched by the tangent lines to circles through $E$. Then $ABCD$ is an Apollonius quadrilateral.

If $A$, $B$, and $C$ are fixed, then the locus of points $D$ that form an Apollonius quadrilateral $ABCD$ is the set of points where the ratio of distances to $A$ and $C$, $\overline{AD}/\overline{CD}$, is the fixed ratio $\overline{AB}/\overline{BC}$; this is just a rewritten form of the defining equation for an Apollonius quadrilateral. As Apollonius of Perga proved, the set of points $D$ having a fixed ratio of distances to two given points $A$ and $C$, and therefore the locus of points that form an Apollonius quadrilateral, is a circle in a family of circles called the Apollonian circles. Because $B$ defines the same ratio of distances, it lies on the same circle. In the case where the fixed ratio is one, the circle degenerates to a line, the perpendicular bisector of $AC$, and the resulting quadrilateral is a kite.

== See also ==
- Tangential quadrilateral, where sums rather than products of opposite sides are equal
