= Bicentric quadrilateral =

Convex, 4-sided shape with an incircle and a circumcircle

Poncelet's porism for bicentric quadrilaterals ABCD and EFGH

In Euclidean geometry, a bicentric quadrilateral is a convex quadrilateral that has both an incircle and a circumcircle. The radii and centers of these circles are called inradius and circumradius, and incenter and circumcenter respectively. From the definition it follows that bicentric quadrilaterals have all the properties of both tangential quadrilaterals and cyclic quadrilaterals. Other names for these quadrilaterals are chord-tangent quadrilateral and inscribed and quadrilateral. It has also rarely been called a double circle quadrilateral and double scribed quadrilateral.

If two circles, one within the other, are the incircle and the circumcircle of a bicentric quadrilateral, then every point on the circumcircle is the vertex of a bicentric quadrilateral having the same incircle and circumcircle. This is a special case of Poncelet's porism, which was proved by the French mathematician Jean-Victor Poncelet (1788–1867).

== Special cases ==
A right kite

Examples of bicentric quadrilaterals are squares, right kites, and isosceles tangential trapezoids.

== Characterizations ==
A bicentric quadrilateral ABCD and its contact quadrilateral WXYZ

A convex quadrilateral ABCD with sides a, b, c, d is bicentric if and only if opposite sides satisfy Pitot's theorem for tangential quadrilaterals and the cyclic quadrilateral property that opposite angles are supplementary; that is,

$$\begin{cases}
a+c=b+d\\
A+C=B+D=\pi.
\end{cases}$$

Three other characterizations concern the points where the incircle in a tangential quadrilateral is tangent to the sides. If the incircle is tangent to the sides AB, BC, CD, DA at W, X, Y, Z respectively, then a tangential quadrilateral ABCD is also cyclic if and only if any one of the following three conditions holds:

- WY is perpendicular to XZ
- $\frac{\overline{AW}}{\overline{WB}}=\frac{\overline{DY}}{\overline{YC}}$
- $\frac{\overline{AC}}{\overline{BD}}=\frac{\overline{AW}+\overline{CY}}{\overline{BX}+\overline{DZ}}$

The first of these three means that the contact quadrilateral WXYZ is an orthodiagonal quadrilateral.

If E, F, G, H are the midpoints of WX, XY, YZ, ZW respectively, then the tangential quadrilateral ABCD is also cyclic if and only if the quadrilateral EFGH is a rectangle.

According to another characterization, if I is the incenter in a tangential quadrilateral where the extensions of opposite sides intersect at J and K, then the quadrilateral is also cyclic if and only if ∠ JIK is a right angle.

Yet another necessary and sufficient condition is that a tangential quadrilateral ABCD is cyclic if and only if its Newton line is perpendicular to the Newton line of its contact quadrilateral WXYZ. (The Newton line of a quadrilateral is the line defined by the midpoints of its diagonals.)

== Construction ==
A bicentric quadrilateral ABCD with the contact quadrilateral WXYZ. Animation see here

There is a simple method for constructing a bicentric quadrilateral:

It starts with the incircle C_{r} around the centre I with the radius r and then draw two to each other perpendicular chords W̅Y̅ and X̅Z̅ in the incircle C_{r}. At the endpoints of the chords draw the tangents a, b, c, d to the incircle. These intersect at four points A, B, C, D, which are the vertices of a bicentric quadrilateral. To draw the circumcircle, draw two perpendicular bisectors p_{1}, p_{2} on the sides of the bicentric quadrilateral a respectively b. The perpendicular bisectors p_{1}, p_{2} intersect in the centre O of the circumcircle C_{R} with the distance x to the centre I of the incircle C_{r}. The circumcircle can be drawn around the centre O.

The validity of this construction is due to the characterization that, in a tangential quadrilateral ABCD, the contact quadrilateral WXYZ has perpendicular diagonals if and only if the tangential quadrilateral is also cyclic.

== Area ==
=== Formulas in terms of four quantities ===
The area K of a bicentric quadrilateral can be expressed in terms of four quantities of the quadrilateral in several different ways. If the sides are a, b, c, d, then the area is given by

$$\displaystyle K = \sqrt{abcd}.$$

This is a special case of Brahmagupta's formula. It can also be derived directly from the trigonometric formula for the area of a tangential quadrilateral. Note that the converse does not hold: Some quadrilaterals that are not bicentric also have area $\displaystyle K = \sqrt{abcd}.$ One example of such a quadrilateral is a non-square rectangle.

The area can also be expressed in terms of the tangent lengths e, f, g, h as

$$K=\sqrt[4]{efgh}(e+f+g+h).$$

A formula for the area of bicentric quadrilateral ABCD with incenter I is

$$K=\overline{AI} \cdot \overline{CI} + \overline{BI} \cdot \overline{DI}.$$

If a bicentric quadrilateral has tangency chords k, l and diagonals p, q, then it has area

$$K=\frac{klpq}{k^2+l^2}.$$

If k, l are the tangency chords and m, n are the bimedians of the quadrilateral, then the area can be calculated using the formula

$$K=\left|\frac{m^2-n^2}{k^2-l^2}\right|kl$$

This formula cannot be used if the quadrilateral is a right kite, since the denominator is zero in that case.

If M, N are the midpoints of the diagonals, and E, F are the intersection points of the extensions of opposite sides, then the area of a bicentric quadrilateral is given by

$$K=\frac{2\overline{MN} \cdot \overline{EI} \cdot \overline{FI}}{\overline{EF}}$$

where I is the center of the incircle.

=== Formulas in terms of three quantities ===
The area of a bicentric quadrilateral can be expressed in terms of two opposite sides and the angle θ between the diagonals according to

$$K=ac\tan{\frac{\theta}{2}}=bd\cot{\frac{\theta}{2}}.$$

In terms of two adjacent angles and the radius r of the incircle, the area is given by

$$K=2r^2\left(\frac{1}{\sin{A}}+\frac{1}{\sin{B}}\right).$$

The area is given in terms of the circumradius R and the inradius r as

$$K=r(r+\sqrt{4R^2+r^2})\sin \theta$$

where θ is either angle between the diagonals.

If M, N are the midpoints of the diagonals, and E, F are the intersection points of the extensions of opposite sides, then the area can also be expressed as

$$K=2\overline{MN}\sqrt{\overline{EQ} \cdot \overline{FQ}}$$

where Q is the foot of the perpendicular to the line EF through the center of the incircle.

=== Inequalities ===
If r and R are the inradius and the circumradius respectively, then the area K satisfies the inequalities

$$\displaystyle 4r^2 \le K \le 2R^2.$$

There is equality on either side only if the quadrilateral is a square.

Another inequality for the area is

$$K \le \tfrac{4}{3}r\sqrt{4R^2+r^2}$$

where r and R are the inradius and the circumradius respectively.

A similar inequality giving a sharper upper bound for the area than the previous one is

$$K \le r(r+\sqrt{4R^2+r^2})$$

with equality holding if and only if the quadrilateral is a right kite.

In addition, with sides a, b, c, d and semiperimeter s:

$2\sqrt{K} \leq s \leq r+ \sqrt{r^2+4R^2};$

$6K \leq ab+ac+ad+bc+bd+cd \leq 4r^2+4R^2+ 4r\sqrt{r^2+4R^2};$

$4Kr^2\leq abcd \leq \frac{16}{9} r^2(r^2+4R^2).$

== Angle formulas ==
If a, b, c, d are the length of the sides AB, BC, CD, DA respectively in a bicentric quadrilateral ABCD, then its vertex angles can be calculated with the tangent function:

$$\begin{align}
\tan{\frac{A}{2}} &= \sqrt{\frac{bc}{ad}} = \cot{\frac{C}{2}}, \\
\tan{\frac{B}{2}} &= \sqrt{\frac{cd}{ab}} = \cot{\frac{D}{2}}.
\end{align}$$

Using the same notations, for the sine and cosine functions the following formulas holds:

$$\begin{align}
\sin{\frac{A}{2}} &= \sqrt{\frac{bc}{ad+bc}} = \cos{\frac{C}{2}}, \\
\cos{\frac{A}{2}} &= \sqrt{\frac{ad}{ad+bc}} = \sin{\frac{C}{2}}, \\
\sin{\frac{B}{2}} &= \sqrt{\frac{cd}{ab+cd}} = \cos{\frac{D}{2}}, \\
\cos{\frac{B}{2}} &= \sqrt{\frac{ab}{ab+cd}} = \sin{\frac{D}{2}}.
\end{align}$$

The angle θ between the diagonals can be calculated from

$$\displaystyle \tan{\frac{\theta}{2}}=\sqrt{\frac{bd}{ac}}.$$

== Inradius and circumradius ==
The inradius r of a bicentric quadrilateral is determined by the sides a, b, c, d according to

$$\displaystyle r=\frac{\sqrt{abcd}}{a+c}=\frac{\sqrt{abcd}}{b+d}.$$

The circumradius R is given as a special case of Parameshvara's formula. It is

$$\displaystyle R=\frac{1}{4}\sqrt{\frac{(ab+cd)(ac+bd)(ad+bc)}{abcd}}.$$

The inradius can also be expressed in terms of the consecutive tangent lengths e, f, g, h according to

$$\displaystyle r=\sqrt{eg}=\sqrt{fh}.$$

These two formulas are in fact necessary and sufficient conditions for a tangential quadrilateral with inradius r to be cyclic.

The four sides a, b, c, d of a bicentric quadrilateral are the four solutions of the quartic equation

$$y^4-2sy^3+(s^2+2r^2+2r\sqrt{4R^2+r^2})y^2-2rs(\sqrt{4R^2+r^2}+r)y+r^2s^2=0$$

where s is the semiperimeter, and r and R are the inradius and circumradius respectively.

If there is a bicentric quadrilateral with inradius r whose tangent lengths are e, f, g, h, then there exists a bicentric quadrilateral with inradius r^{v} whose tangent lengths are $e^v,f^v,g^v,h^v,$ where v may be any real number.

A bicentric quadrilateral has a greater inradius than does any other tangential quadrilateral having the same sequence of side lengths.

=== Inequalities ===
The circumradius R and the inradius r satisfy the inequality

$$R\ge \sqrt{2}r$$

which was proved by L. Fejes Tóth in 1948. It holds with equality only when the two circles are concentric (have the same center as each other); then the quadrilateral is a square. The inequality can be proved in several different ways, one using the double inequality for the area above.

An extension of the previous inequality is

$$\frac{r\sqrt{2}}{R}\le \frac{1}{2}\left(\sin{\frac{A}{2}}\cos{\frac{B}{2}}+\sin{\frac{B}{2}}\cos{\frac{C}{2}}+\sin{\frac{C}{2}}\cos{\frac{D}{2}}+\sin{\frac{D}{2}}\cos{\frac{A}{2}}\right)\le 1$$

where there is equality on either side if and only if the quadrilateral is a square.

The semiperimeter s of a bicentric quadrilateral satisfies

$$\sqrt{8r\left(\sqrt{4R^2+r^2}-r\right)}\le s \le \sqrt{4R^2+r^2}+r$$

where r and R are the inradius and circumradius respectively.

Moreover,

$$2sr^2\leq abc+abd+acd+bcd \leq 2r(r+\sqrt{r^2+4R^2})^2$$

and

$abc+abd+acd+bcd \leq 2\sqrt{K}(K+2R^2).$

== Distance between the incenter and circumcenter ==
A bicentric quadrilateral ABCD with incenter I and circumcenter O

=== Fuss's theorem ===
Fuss's theorem gives a relation between the inradius r, the circumradius R and the distance x between the incenter I and the circumcenter O, for any bicentric quadrilateral. The relation is

$$\frac{1}{(R-x)^2}+\frac{1}{(R+x)^2}=\frac{1}{r^2},$$

or equivalently

$$\displaystyle 2r^2(R^2+x^2)=(R^2-x^2)^2.$$

It was derived by Nicolaus Fuss (1755–1826) in 1792. Solving for x yields

$$x=\sqrt{R^2+r^2-r\sqrt{4R^2+r^2}}.$$

Fuss's theorem, which is the analog of Euler's theorem for triangles for bicentric quadrilaterals, says that if a quadrilateral is bicentric, then its two associated circles are related according to the above equations. In fact the converse also holds: given two circles (one within the other) with radii R and r and distance x between their centers satisfying the condition in Fuss's theorem, there exists a convex quadrilateral inscribed in one of them and tangent to the other (and then by Poncelet's closure theorem, there exist infinitely many of them).

Applying $x^2 \ge 0$ to the expression of Fuss's theorem for x in terms of r and R is another way to obtain the above-mentioned inequality $R \ge \sqrt{2}r.$ A generalization is

$$2r^2+x^2\le R^2 \le 2r^2+x^2+2rx.$$

=== Carlitz's identity ===
Another formula for the distance x between the centers of the incircle and the circumcircle is due to the American mathematician Leonard Carlitz (1907–1999). It states that

$$\displaystyle x^2=R^2-2Rr\cdot \mu$$

where r and R are the inradius and the circumradius respectively, and

$$\displaystyle \mu=\sqrt{\frac{(ab+cd)(ad+bc)}{(a+c)^2(ac+bd)}} = \sqrt{\frac{(ab+cd)(ad+bc)}{(b+d)^2(ac+bd)}}$$

where a, b, c, d are the sides of the bicentric quadrilateral.

=== Inequalities for the tangent lengths and sides ===
For the tangent lengths e, f, g, h the following inequalities holds:

$$4r\le e+f+g+h \le 4r\cdot \frac{R^2+x^2}{R^2-x^2}$$

and

$$4r^2\le e^2+f^2+g^2+h^2 \le 4(R^2+x^2-r^2)$$

where r is the inradius, R is the circumradius, and x is the distance between the incenter and circumcenter. The sides a, b, c, d satisfy the inequalities

$$8r\le a+b+c+d \le 8r\cdot \frac{R^2+x^2}{R^2-x^2}$$

and

$$4(R^2-x^2+2r^2)\le a^2+b^2+c^2+d^2 \le 4(3R^2-2r^2).$$

== Other properties of the incenter ==
The circumcenter, the incenter, and the intersection of the diagonals in a bicentric quadrilateral are collinear.

There is the following equality relating the four distances between the incenter I and the vertices of a bicentric quadrilateral ABCD:

$$\frac{1}{\overline{AI}^2}+\frac{1}{\overline{CI}^2}=\frac{1}{\overline{BI}^2}+\frac{1}{\overline{DI}^2}=\frac{1}{r^2}$$

where r is the inradius.

If P is the intersection of the diagonals in a bicentric quadrilateral ABCD with incenter I, then

$$\frac{\overline{AP}}{\overline{CP}}=\frac{\overline{AI}^2}{\overline{CI}^2}.$$

== Properties of the diagonals ==
The lengths of the diagonals in a bicentric quadrilateral can be expressed in terms of the sides or the tangent lengths, which are formulas that holds in a cyclic quadrilateral and a tangential quadrilateral respectively.

In a bicentric quadrilateral with diagonals p, q, the following identity holds:

$$\displaystyle \frac{pq}{4r^2}-\frac{4R^2}{pq}=1$$

where r and R are the inradius and the circumradius respectively. This equality can be rewritten as

$$r=\frac{pq}{2\sqrt{pq+4R^2}}$$

or, solving it as a quadratic equation for the product of the diagonals, in the form

$$pq=2r\left(r+\sqrt{4R^2+r^2}\right).$$

An inequality for the product of the diagonals p, q in a bicentric quadrilateral is

$$\displaystyle 8pq\le (a+b+c+d)^2$$

where a, b, c, d are the sides. This was proved by Murray S. Klamkin in 1967.

== Four incenters lie on a circle ==
Let ABCD be a bicentric quadrilateral and O the center of its circumcircle. Then the incenters of the four triangles △OAB, △OBC, △OCD, △ODA lie on a circle.

== See also ==
- Bicentric polygon
- Ex-tangential quadrilateral
