= Kite (geometry) =

Quadrilateral symmetric across a diagonal

- A kite, showing its pairs of equal-length sides and its inscribed circle.
- Type: Quadrilateral
- Edges and vertices: 4
- Symmetry group: D_{1} (*)
- Area: 1/2 × product of diagonals
- Dual polygon: Isosceles trapezoid

In Euclidean geometry, a kite is a quadrilateral with reflection symmetry across a diagonal. Because of this symmetry, a kite has two equal angles and two pairs of adjacent equal-length sides. Kites are also known as deltoids, but the word deltoid may also refer to a deltoid curve, an unrelated geometric object sometimes studied in connection with quadrilaterals. A kite may also be called a dart, particularly if it is not convex.

Every kite is an orthodiagonal quadrilateral (its diagonals are at right angles) and, when convex, a tangential quadrilateral (its sides are tangent to an inscribed circle). The convex kites are exactly the quadrilaterals that are both orthodiagonal and tangential. They include as special cases the right kites, with two opposite right angles; the rhombi, with two diagonal axes of symmetry; and the squares, which are also special cases of both right kites and rhombi.

The quadrilateral with the greatest ratio of perimeter to diameter is a kite, with 60°, 75°, and 150° angles. Kites of two shapes (one convex and one non-convex) form the prototiles of one of the forms of the Penrose tiling. Kites also form the faces of several face-symmetric polyhedra and tessellations, and have been studied in connection with outer billiards, a problem in the advanced mathematics of dynamical systems.

== Definition and classification ==
Convex and concave kites

A kite is a quadrilateral with reflection symmetry across one of its diagonals. Equivalently, it is a quadrilateral whose four sides can be grouped into two pairs of adjacent equal-length sides. A kite can be constructed from the centers and crossing points of any two intersecting circles. Kites as described here may be either convex or concave, although some sources restrict kite to mean only convex kites. A quadrilateral is a kite if and only if any one of the following conditions is true:

- The four sides can be split into two pairs of adjacent equal-length sides.
- One diagonal crosses the midpoint of the other diagonal at a right angle, forming its perpendicular bisector. (In the concave case, the line through one of the diagonals bisects the other.)
- One diagonal is a line of symmetry. It divides the quadrilateral into two congruent triangles that are mirror images of each other.
- One diagonal bisects both of the angles at its two ends.

Kite quadrilaterals are named for the wind-blown, flying kites, which often have this shape and which are in turn named for a hovering bird and the sound it makes. According to Olaus Henrici, the name "kite" was given to these shapes by James Joseph Sylvester.

Quadrilaterals can be classified hierarchically, meaning that some classes of quadrilaterals include other classes, or partitionally, meaning that each quadrilateral is in only one class. Classified hierarchically, kites include the rhombi (quadrilaterals with four equal sides), squares, and Apollonius quadrilaterals (in which the products of opposite sides are equal). All equilateral kites are rhombi, and all equiangular kites are squares. When classified partitionally, rhombi and squares would not be kites, because they belong to a different class of quadrilaterals; similarly, the right kites discussed below would not be kites. The remainder of this article follows a hierarchical classification; rhombi, squares, and right kites are all considered kites. By avoiding the need to consider special cases, this classification can simplify some facts about kites.

Like kites, a parallelogram also has two pairs of equal-length sides, but they are opposite to each other rather than adjacent. Any non-self-crossing quadrilateral that has an axis of symmetry must be either a kite, with a diagonal axis of symmetry; or an isosceles trapezoid, with an axis of symmetry through the midpoints of two sides. These include as special cases the rhombus and the rectangle respectively, and the square, which is a special case of both. The self-crossing quadrilaterals include another class of symmetric quadrilaterals, the antiparallelograms.

== Special cases ==
Right kite

Equidiagonal kite in a Reuleaux triangle

Lute of Pythagoras

The right kites have two opposite right angles. The right kites are exactly the kites that are cyclic quadrilaterals, meaning that there is a circle that passes through all their vertices. The cyclic quadrilaterals may equivalently defined as the quadrilaterals in which two opposite angles are supplementary (they add to 180°); if one pair is supplementary the other is as well. Therefore, the right kites are the kites with two opposite supplementary angles, for either of the two opposite pairs of angles. Because right kites circumscribe one circle and are inscribed in another circle, they are bicentric quadrilaterals (actually tricentric, as they also have a third circle externally tangent to the extensions of their sides). If the sizes of an inscribed and a circumscribed circle are fixed, the right kite has the largest area of any quadrilateral trapped between them.

Among all quadrilaterals, the shape that has the greatest ratio of its perimeter to its diameter (maximum distance between any two points) is an equidiagonal kite with angles 60°, 75°, 150°, 75°. Its four vertices lie at the three corners and one of the side midpoints of the Reuleaux triangle. An equidiagonal kite is a special case of a midsquare quadrilateral. When an equidiagonal kite has side lengths less than or equal to its diagonals, like this one or the square, it is one of the quadrilaterals with the greatest ratio of area to diameter.

A kite with three 108° angles and one 36° angle forms the convex hull of the lute of Pythagoras, a fractal made of nested pentagrams. The four sides of this kite lie on four of the sides of a regular pentagon, with a golden triangle glued onto the fifth side.

Part of an aperiodic tiling with prototiles made from eight kites

There are only eight polygons that can tile the plane such that reflecting any tile across any one of its edges produces another tile; this arrangement is called an edge tessellation. One of them is a tiling by a right kite, with 60°, 90°, and 120° angles. It produces the deltoidal trihexagonal tiling (see § Tilings and polyhedra). A prototile made by eight of these kites tiles the plane only aperiodically, key to a claimed solution of the einstein problem.

In non-Euclidean geometry, a kite can have three right angles and one non-right angle, forming a special case of a Lambert quadrilateral. The fourth angle is acute in hyperbolic geometry and obtuse in spherical geometry.

== Properties ==
=== Diagonals, angles, and area ===
Every kite is an orthodiagonal quadrilateral, meaning that its two diagonals are at right angles to each other. Moreover, one of the two diagonals (the symmetry axis) is the perpendicular bisector of the other, and is also the angle bisector of the two angles it meets. Because of its symmetry, the other two angles of the kite must be equal. The diagonal symmetry axis of a convex kite divides it into two congruent triangles; the other diagonal divides it into two isosceles triangles.

As is true more generally for any orthodiagonal quadrilateral, the area $A$ of a kite may be calculated as half the product of the lengths of the diagonals $p$ and $q$:
$$A =\frac{p \cdot q}{2}.$$
Alternatively, the area can be calculated by dividing the kite into two congruent triangles and applying the SAS formula for their area. If $a$ and $b$ are the lengths of two sides of the kite, and $\theta$ is the angle between, then the area is
$$\displaystyle A = ab \cdot \sin\theta.$$

=== Inscribed circle ===
Two circles tangent to the sides and extended sides of a convex kite (top), non-convex kite (middle), and antiparallelogram (bottom). The four lines through the sides of each quadrilateral are bitangents of the circles.

Every convex kite is also a tangential quadrilateral, a quadrilateral that has an inscribed circle. That is, there exists a circle that is tangent to all four sides. Additionally, if a convex kite is not a rhombus, there is a circle outside the kite that is tangent to the extensions of the four sides; therefore, every convex kite that is not a rhombus is an ex-tangential quadrilateral. The convex kites that are not rhombi are exactly the quadrilaterals that are both tangential and ex-tangential. For every concave kite there exist two circles tangent to two of the sides and the extensions of the other two: one is interior to the kite and touches the two sides opposite from the concave angle, while the other circle is exterior to the kite and touches the kite on the two edges incident to the concave angle.

For a convex kite with diagonal lengths $p$ and $q$ and side lengths $a$ and $b$, the radius $r$ of the inscribed circle is
$$r=\frac{pq}{2(a+b)},$$
and the radius $\rho$ of the ex-tangential circle is
$$\rho=\frac{pq}{2|a-b|}.$$

A tangential quadrilateral is also a kite if and only if any one of the following conditions is true:

- The area is one half the product of the diagonals.
- The diagonals are perpendicular. (Thus the kites are exactly the quadrilaterals that are both tangential and orthodiagonal.)
- The two line segments connecting opposite points of tangency have equal length.
- The tangent lengths, distances from a point of tangency to an adjacent vertex of the quadrilateral, are equal at two opposite vertices of the quadrilateral. (At each vertex, there are two adjacent points of tangency, but they are the same distance as each other from the vertex, so each vertex has a single tangent length.)
- The two bimedians, line segments connecting midpoints of opposite edges, have equal length.
- The products of opposite side lengths are equal.
- The center of the incircle lies on a line of symmetry that is also a diagonal.

If the diagonals in a tangential quadrilateral $ABCD$ intersect at $P$, and the incircles of triangles $ABP$, $BCP$, $CDP$, $DAP$ have radii $r_1$, $r_2$, $r_3$, and $r_4$ respectively, then the quadrilateral is a kite if and only if
$$r_1+r_3=r_2+r_4.$$
If the excircles to the same four triangles opposite the vertex $P$ have radii $R_1$, $R_2$, $R_3$, and $R_4$ respectively, then the quadrilateral is a kite if and only if
$$R_1+R_3=R_2+R_4.$$

=== Duality ===
A kite and its dual isosceles trapezoid

Kites and isosceles trapezoids are dual to each other, meaning that there is a correspondence between them that reverses the dimension of their parts, taking vertices to sides and sides to vertices. From any kite, the inscribed circle is tangent to its four sides at the four vertices of an isosceles trapezoid. For any isosceles trapezoid, tangent lines to the circumscribing circle at its four vertices form the four sides of a kite. This correspondence can also be seen as an example of polar reciprocation, a general method for corresponding points with lines and vice versa given a fixed circle. Although they do not touch the circle, the four vertices of the kite are reciprocal in this sense to the four sides of the isosceles trapezoid. The features of kites and isosceles trapezoids that correspond to each other under this duality are compared in the table below.

Isosceles trapezoid	Kite
Two pairs of equal adjacent angles	Two pairs of equal adjacent sides
Two equal opposite sides	Two equal opposite angles
Two opposite sides with a shared perpendicular bisector	Two opposite angles with a shared angle bisector
An axis of symmetry through two opposite sides	An axis of symmetry through two opposite angles
Circumscribed circle through all vertices	Inscribed circle tangent to all sides

=== Dissection ===
The equidissection problem concerns the subdivision of polygons into triangles that all have equal areas. In this context, the spectrum of a polygon is the set of numbers $n$ such that the polygon has an equidissection into $n$ equal-area triangles. Because of its symmetry, the spectrum of a kite contains all even integers. Certain special kites also contain some odd numbers in their spectra.

Every triangle can be subdivided into three right kites meeting at the center of its inscribed circle. More generally, a method based on circle packing can be used to subdivide any polygon with $n$ sides into $O(n)$ kites, meeting edge-to-edge.

== Tilings and polyhedra ==
Recursive construction of the kite and dart Penrose tiling

Fractal rosette of Penrose kites

All kites tile the plane by repeated point reflection around the midpoints of their edges, as do more generally all quadrilaterals. Kites and darts with angles 72°, 72°, 72°, 144° and 36°, 72°, 36°, 216°, respectively, form the prototiles of one version of the Penrose tiling, an aperiodic tiling of the plane discovered by mathematical physicist Roger Penrose. When a kite has angles that, at its apex and one side, sum to $\pi(1-\tfrac1n)$ for some positive integer $n$, then scaled copies of that kite can be used to tile the plane in a fractal rosette in which successively larger rings of $n$ kites surround a central point. These rosettes can be used to study the phenomenon of inelastic collapse, in which a system of moving particles meeting in inelastic collisions all coalesce at a common point.

A kite with angles 60°, 90°, 120°, 90° can also tile the plane by repeated reflection across its edges; the resulting tessellation, the deltoidal trihexagonal tiling, superposes a tessellation of the plane by regular hexagons and isosceles triangles. The deltoidal icositetrahedron, deltoidal hexecontahedron, and trapezohedron are polyhedra with congruent kite-shaped faces, which can alternatively be thought of as tilings of the sphere by congruent spherical kites. There are infinitely many face-symmetric tilings of the hyperbolic plane by kites. These polyhedra (equivalently, spherical tilings), the square and deltoidal trihexagonal tilings of the Euclidean plane, and some tilings of the hyperbolic plane are shown in the table below, labeled by face configuration (the numbers of neighbors of each of the four vertices of each tile). Some polyhedra and tilings appear twice, under two different face configurations.

Polyhedra			Euclidean
V4.3.4.3	V4.3.4.4	V4.3.4.5	V4.3.4.6
Polyhedra	Euclidean	Hyperbolic tilings	
V4.4.4.3	V4.4.4.4	V4.4.4.5	V4.4.4.6
Polyhedra	Hyperbolic tilings		
V4.3.4.5	V4.4.4.5	V4.5.4.5	V4.6.4.5
Euclidean	Hyperbolic tilings		
V4.3.4.6	V4.4.4.6	V4.5.4.6	V4.6.4.6

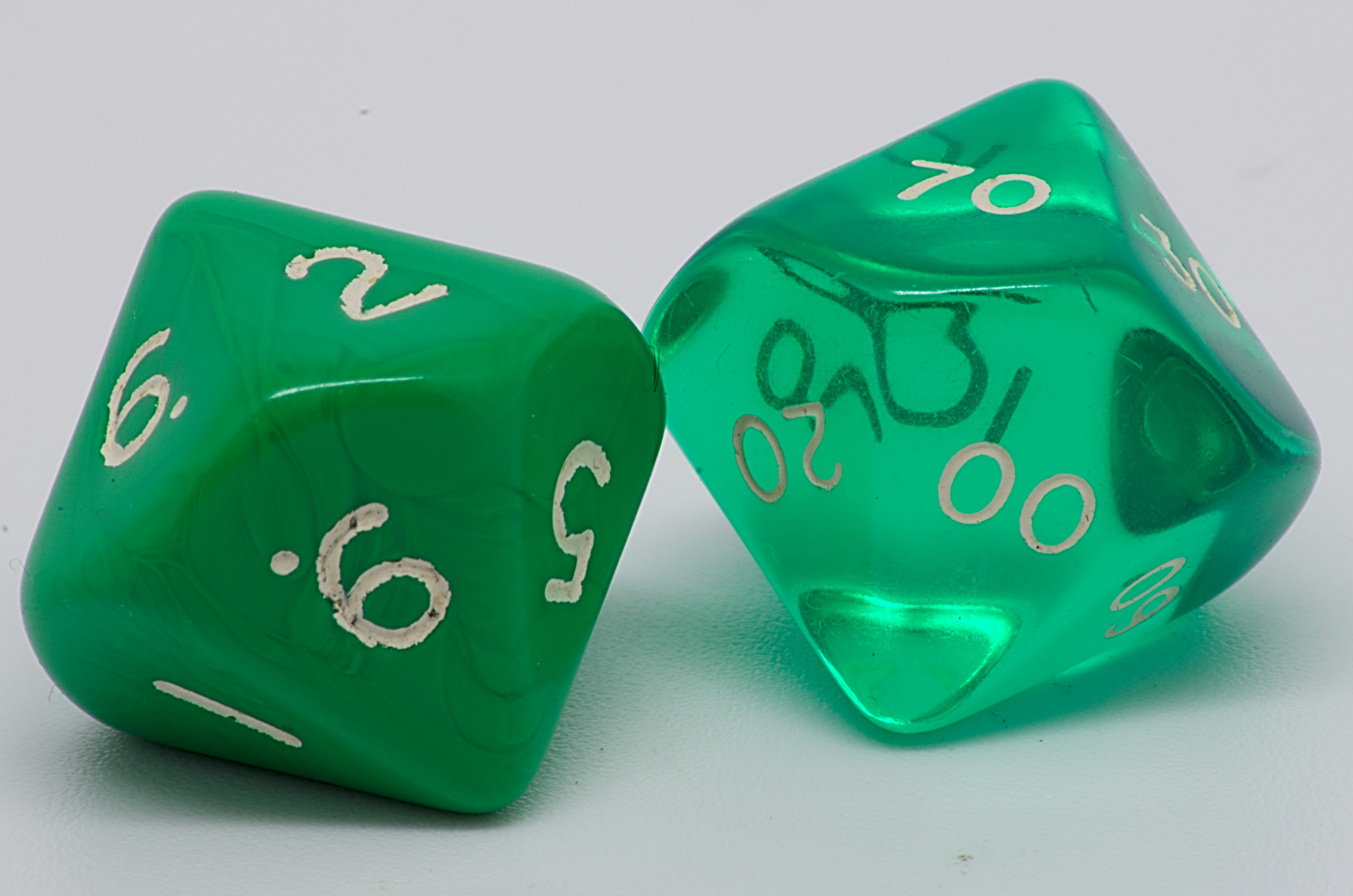
Ten-sided dice

The trapezohedra are another family of polyhedra that have congruent kite-shaped faces. In these polyhedra, the edges of one of the two side lengths of the kite meet at two "pole" vertices, while the edges of the other length form an equatorial zigzag path around the polyhedron. They are the dual polyhedra of the uniform antiprisms. A commonly seen example is the pentagonal trapezohedron, used for ten-sided dice.

== Outer billiards ==
Mathematician Richard Schwartz has studied outer billiards on kites. Outer billiards is a dynamical system in which, from a point outside a given compact convex set in the plane, one draws a tangent line to the convex set, travels from the starting point along this line to another point equally far from the point of tangency, and then repeats the same process. It had been open since the 1950s whether any system defined in this way could produce paths that get arbitrarily far from their starting point, and in a 2007 paper Schwartz solved this problem by finding unbounded billiards paths for the kite with angles 72°, 72°, 72°, 144°, the same as the one used in the Penrose tiling. He later wrote a monograph analyzing outer billiards for kite shapes more generally. For this problem, any affine transformation of a kite preserves the dynamical properties of outer billiards on it, and it is possible to transform any kite into a shape where three vertices are at the points $(-1,0)$ and $(0,\pm1)$, with the fourth at $(\alpha,0)$ with $\alpha$ in the open unit interval $(0,1)$. The behavior of outer billiards on any kite depends strongly on the parameter $\alpha$ and in particular whether it is rational. For the case of the Penrose kite, $\textstyle \alpha=1/\varphi^3$, an irrational number, where $\varphi =\tfrac12\bigl(1+\sqrt5~\!\bigr)$ is the golden ratio.
