= Tangential quadrilateral =

Polygon whose four sides all touch a circle

A tangential quadrilateral with its incircle

In Euclidean geometry, a tangential quadrilateral (sometimes just tangent quadrilateral) or circumscribed quadrilateral is a convex quadrilateral whose sides all can be tangent to a single circle within the quadrilateral. This circle is called the incircle of the quadrilateral or its inscribed circle, its center is the incenter and its radius is called the inradius. Since these quadrilaterals can be drawn surrounding or circumscribing their incircles, they have also been called circumscribable quadrilaterals, circumscribing quadrilaterals, and circumscriptible quadrilaterals. Tangential quadrilaterals are a special case of tangential polygons.

Other less frequently used names for this class of quadrilaterals are inscriptable quadrilateral, inscriptible quadrilateral, inscribable quadrilateral, circumcyclic quadrilateral, and co-cyclic quadrilateral. Due to the risk of confusion with a quadrilateral that has a circumcircle, which is called a cyclic quadrilateral or inscribed quadrilateral, it is preferable not to use any of the last five names.

All triangles can have an incircle, but not all quadrilaterals do. An example of a quadrilateral that cannot be tangential is a non-square rectangle. The section characterizations below states what necessary and sufficient conditions a quadrilateral must satisfy to be able to have an incircle.

== Special cases ==
Examples of tangential quadrilaterals are the kites, which include the rhombi, which in turn include the squares. The kites are exactly the tangential quadrilaterals that are also orthodiagonal. A right kite is a kite with a circumcircle. If a quadrilateral is both tangential and cyclic, it is called a bicentric quadrilateral, and if it is both tangential and a trapezoid, it is called a tangential trapezoid.

== Characterizations ==
In a tangential quadrilateral, the four angle bisectors meet at the center of the incircle. Conversely, a convex quadrilateral in which the four angle bisectors meet at a point must be tangential and the common point is the incenter.

According to the Pitot theorem, the two pairs of opposite sides in a tangential quadrilateral add up to the same total length, which equals the semiperimeter s of the quadrilateral:

$$a + c = b + d = \frac{a + b + c + d}{2} = s.$$

Conversely a convex quadrilateral in which a + c = b + d must be tangential.

If opposite sides in a convex quadrilateral ABCD (that is not a trapezoid) intersect at E and F, then it is tangential if and only if either of

$$\displaystyle BE+BF=DE+DF$$

or

$$\displaystyle AE-EC=AF-FC:$$

Another necessary and sufficient condition is that a convex quadrilateral ABCD is tangential if and only if the incircles in the two triangles ABC and ADC are tangent to each other.

A characterization regarding the angles formed by diagonal BD and the four sides of a quadrilateral ABCD is due to Iosifescu. He proved in 1954 that a convex quadrilateral has an incircle if and only if

$$\tan{\frac{\angle ABD}{2}}\cdot\tan{\frac{\angle BDC}{2}}=\tan{\frac{\angle ADB}{2}}\cdot\tan{\frac{\angle DBC}{2}}.$$

A tangential quadrilateral (in blue) with its incircle (dashed line) and the four externally tangent circles (in red), each tangent to a given side and the extensions of the adjacent sides.

Further, a convex quadrilateral with successive sides a, b, c, d is tangential if and only if

$$R_aR_c=R_bR_d$$

where R_{a}, R_{b}, R_{c}, R_{d} are the radii in the circles externally tangent to the sides a, b, c, d respectively and the extensions of the adjacent two sides for each side.

Several more characterizations are known in the four subtriangles formed by the diagonals.

== Contact points and tangent lengths ==
A tangential quadrilateral (in blue) and its contact quadrilateral (in green) joining the four contact points between the incircle and the sides. Also shown are the tangency chords joining opposite contact points (in red) and the tangent lengths on the sides

The incircle is tangent to each side at one point of contact. These four points define a new quadrilateral inside of the initial quadrilateral: the contact quadrilateral, which is cyclic as it is inscribed in the initial quadrilateral's incircle.

The eight tangent lengths (e, f, g, h in the figure to the right) of a tangential quadrilateral are the line segments from a vertex to the points of contact. From each vertex, there are two congruent tangent lengths.

The two tangency chords (k and l in the figure) of a tangential quadrilateral are the line segments that connect contact points on opposite sides. These are also the diagonals of the contact quadrilateral.

== Area ==
Proof without words that the area of a tangential quadrilateral equals the product of its inradius and its semiperimeter – the dashed edges also show that the total length of even-numbered edges equal that of odd-numbered ones

=== Non-trigonometric formulas ===
The area K of a tangential quadrilateral is given by

$$\displaystyle K = r \cdot s,$$

where s is the semiperimeter and r is the inradius. Another formula is

$$\displaystyle K = \tfrac{1}{2}\sqrt{p^2q^2-(ac-bd)^2}$$

which gives the area in terms of the diagonals p, q and the sides a, b, c, d of the tangential quadrilateral.

The area can also be expressed in terms of just the four tangent lengths. If these are e, f, g, h, then the tangential quadrilateral has the area

$$\displaystyle K=\sqrt{(e+f+g+h)(efg+fgh+ghe+hef)}.$$

Furthermore, the area of a tangential quadrilateral can be expressed in terms of the sides a, b, c, d and the successive tangent lengths e, f, g, h as

$$K=\sqrt{abcd-(eg-fh)^2}.$$

Since eg = fh if and only if the tangential quadrilateral is also cyclic and hence bicentric, this shows that the maximal area $\sqrt{abcd}$ occurs if and only if the tangential quadrilateral is bicentric.

=== Trigonometric formulas ===
A trigonometric formula for the area in terms of the sides a, b, c, d and two opposite angles is

$$\displaystyle K = \sqrt{abcd} \sin \frac{A+C}{2} = \sqrt{abcd} \sin \frac{B+D}{2}.$$

For given side lengths, the area is maximum when the quadrilateral is also cyclic and hence a bicentric quadrilateral. Then $K = \sqrt{abcd}$ since opposite angles are supplementary angles. This can be proved in another way using calculus.

Another formula for the area of a tangential quadrilateral ABCD that involves two opposite angles is

$$K=\left(IA\cdot IC+IB\cdot ID\right)\sin\frac{A+C}{2}$$

where I is the incenter.

In fact, the area can be expressed in terms of just two adjacent sides and two opposite angles as

$$K=ab\sin{\frac{B}{2}}\csc{\frac{D}{2}}\sin \frac{B+D}{2}.$$

Still another area formula is

$$K=\tfrac{1}{2}|(ac-bd)\tan{\theta}|,$$

where θ is either of the angles between the diagonals. This formula cannot be used when the tangential quadrilateral is a kite, since then θ is 90° and the tangent function is not defined.

=== Inequalities ===
As indirectly noted above, the area of a tangential quadrilateral with sides a, b, c, d satisfies

$$K\le\sqrt{abcd}$$

with equality if and only if it is a bicentric quadrilateral.

According to T. A. Ivanova (1976), the semiperimeter s of a tangential quadrilateral satisfies

$$s\ge 4r$$

where r is the inradius. There is equality if and only if the quadrilateral is a square. This means that for the area K = rs, there is the inequality

$$K\ge 4r^2$$

with equality if and only if the tangential quadrilateral is a square.

=== Partition properties ===
Tangential quadrilateral with inradius r

The four line segments between the center of the incircle and the points where it is tangent to the quadrilateral partition the quadrilateral into four right kites.

If a line cuts a tangential quadrilateral into two polygons with equal areas and equal perimeters, then that line passes through the incenter.

== Inradius ==
The inradius in a tangential quadrilateral with consecutive sides a, b, c, d is given by

$$r=\frac{K}{s}=\frac{K}{a+c}=\frac{K}{b+d}$$

where K is the area of the quadrilateral and s is its semiperimeter. For a tangential quadrilateral with given sides, the inradius is maximum when the quadrilateral is also cyclic (and hence a bicentric quadrilateral).

In terms of the tangent lengths, the incircle has radius

$$\displaystyle r=\sqrt{\frac{efg+fgh+ghe+hef}{e+f+g+h}}.$$

The inradius can also be expressed in terms of the distances from the incenter I to the vertices of the tangential quadrilateral ABCD. If u = AI, v = BI, x = CI and y = DI, then

$$r=2\sqrt{\frac{(\sigma-uvx)(\sigma-vxy)(\sigma-xyu)(\sigma-yuv)}{uvxy(uv+xy)(ux+vy)(uy+vx)}}$$

where $\sigma=\tfrac{1}{2}(uvx+vxy+xyu+yuv)$.

If the incircles in triangles ABC, BCD, CDA, DAB have radii $r_1, r_2, r_3, r_4$ respectively, then the inradius of a tangential quadrilateral ABCD is given by

$$r=\frac{G+\sqrt{G^2-4r_1r_2r_3r_4(r_1r_3+r_2r_4)}}{2(r_1r_3+r_2r_4)}$$

where $G=r_1r_2r_3+r_2r_3r_4+r_3r_4r_1+r_4r_1r_2$.

== Angle formulas ==
If e, f, g and h are the tangent lengths from the vertices A, B, C and D respectively to the points where the incircle is tangent to the sides of a tangential quadrilateral ABCD, then the angles of the quadrilateral can be calculated from

$$\sin{\frac{A}{2}}=\sqrt{\frac{efg + fgh + ghe + hef}{(e + f)(e + g)(e + h)}},$$
$$\sin{\frac{B}{2}}=\sqrt{\frac{efg + fgh + ghe + hef}{(f + e)(f + g)(f + h)}},$$
$$\sin{\frac{C}{2}}=\sqrt{\frac{efg + fgh + ghe + hef}{(g + e)(g + f)(g + h)}},$$
$$\sin{\frac{D}{2}}=\sqrt{\frac{efg + fgh + ghe + hef}{(h + e)(h + f)(h + g)}}.$$

The angle between the tangency chords k and l is given by

$$\sin{\varphi}=\sqrt{\frac{(e + f + g + h)(efg + fgh + ghe + hef)}{(e + f)(f + g)(g + h)(h + e)}}.$$

== Diagonals ==
If e, f, g and h are the tangent lengths from A, B, C and D respectively to the points where the incircle is tangent to the sides of a tangential quadrilateral ABCD, then the lengths of the diagonals p = AC and q = BD are

$$\displaystyle p=\sqrt{\frac{e+g}{f+h}\Big((e+g)(f+h)+4fh\Big)},$$
$$\displaystyle q=\sqrt{\frac{f+h}{e+g}\Big((e+g)(f+h)+4eg\Big)}.$$

== Tangency chords ==
If e, f, g and h are the tangent lengths of a tangential quadrilateral, then the lengths of the tangency chords are

$$\displaystyle k=\frac{2(efg+fgh+ghe+hef)}{\sqrt{(e+f)(g+h)(e+g)(f+h)}},$$
$$\displaystyle l=\frac{2(efg+fgh+ghe+hef)}{\sqrt{(e+h)(f+g)(e+g)(f+h)}}$$

where the tangency chord of length k connects the sides of lengths a = e + f and c = g + h, and the one of length l connects the sides of lengths b = f + g and d = h + e. The squared ratio of the tangency chords satisfies

$$\frac{k^2}{l^2} = \frac{bd}{ac}.$$

The two tangency chords

- are perpendicular if and only if the tangential quadrilateral also has a circumcircle (it is bicentric).
- have equal lengths if and only if the tangential quadrilateral is a kite.

The tangency chord between the sides AB and CD in a tangential quadrilateral ABCD is longer than the one between the sides BC and DA if and only if the bimedian between the sides AB and CD is shorter than the one between the sides BC and DA.

If tangential quadrilateral ABCD has tangency points W on AB and Y on CD, and if tangency chord WY intersects diagonal BD at M, then the ratio of tangent lengths $\tfrac{BW}{DY}$ equals the ratio $\tfrac{BM}{DM}$ of the segments of diagonal BD.

== Collinear points ==
Construction of the Newton line (in red) of a tangential quadrilateral (in blue), showing the alignment of the incenter I, the midpoints of the diagonals M_{1} and M_{2} and the middle M_{3} of the segment JK (in green) joining the intersection of opposing sides.

If M_{1} and M_{2} are the midpoints of the diagonals AC and BD respectively in a tangential quadrilateral ABCD with incenter I, and if the pairs of opposite sides meet at J and K with M_{3} being the midpoint of JK, then the points M_{3}, M_{1}, I, and M_{2} are collinear. The line containing them is the Newton line of the quadrilateral.

If the extensions of opposite sides in a tangential quadrilateral intersect at J and K, and the extensions of opposite sides in its contact quadrilateral intersect at L and M, then the four points J, L, K and M are collinear.

A tangential quadrilateral is partitioned in four triangles meeting at its incenter I, their orthocenters (purple) and the intersection of the diagonals P (in green) are all colinear,.

If the incircle is tangent to the sides AB, BC, CD, DA at T_{1}, T_{2}, T_{3}, T_{4} respectively, and if N_{1}, N_{2}, N_{3}, N_{4} are the isotomic conjugates of these points with respect to the corresponding sides (that is, AT_{1} = BN_{1} and so on), then the Nagel point of the tangential quadrilateral is defined as the intersection of the lines N_{1}N_{3} and N_{2}N_{4}. Both of these lines divide the perimeter of the quadrilateral into two equal parts. More importantly, the Nagel point N, the "area centroid" G, and the incenter I are collinear in this order, and NG = 2GI. This line is called the Nagel line of a tangential quadrilateral.

In a tangential quadrilateral ABCD with incenter I and where the diagonals intersect at P, let H_{X}, H_{Y}, H_{Z}, H_{W} be the orthocenters of triangles AIB, BIC, CID, DIA. Then the points P, H_{X}, H_{Y}, H_{Z}, H_{W} are collinear.

== Concurrent and perpendicular lines ==
The two diagonals and the two tangency chords are concurrent. One way to see this is as a limiting case of Brianchon's theorem, which states that a hexagon all of whose sides are tangent to a single conic section has three diagonals that meet at a point. From a tangential quadrilateral, one can form a hexagon with two 180° angles, by placing two new vertices at two opposite points of tangency; all six of the sides of this hexagon lie on lines tangent to the inscribed circle, so its diagonals meet at a point. But two of these diagonals are the same as the diagonals of the tangential quadrilateral, and the third diagonal of the hexagon is the line through two opposite points of tangency. Repeating this same argument with the other two points of tangency completes the proof of the result.

If the extensions of opposite sides in a tangential quadrilateral intersect at J and K, and the diagonals intersect at P, then JK is perpendicular to the extension of IP where I is the incenter.

== Incenter ==
The incenter of a tangential quadrilateral lies on its Newton line (which connects the midpoints of the diagonals).

The ratio of two opposite sides in a tangential quadrilateral can be expressed in terms of the distances between the incenter I and the vertices according to

$$\frac{AB}{CD}=\frac{IA\cdot IB}{IC\cdot ID},\quad\quad \frac{BC}{DA}=\frac{IB\cdot IC}{ID\cdot IA}.$$

The product of two adjacent sides in a tangential quadrilateral ABCD with incenter I satisfies

$$AB\cdot BC=IB^2+\frac{IA\cdot IB\cdot IC}{ID}.$$

If I is the incenter of a tangential quadrilateral ABCD, then

$$IA\cdot IC+IB\cdot ID=\sqrt{AB\cdot BC\cdot CD\cdot DA}.$$

The incenter I in a tangential quadrilateral ABCD coincides with the "vertex centroid" of the quadrilateral if and only if

$$IA\cdot IC=IB\cdot ID.$$

If M_{p} and M_{q} are the midpoints of the diagonals AC and BD respectively in a tangential quadrilateral ABCD with incenter I, then

$$\frac{IM_p}{IM_q}=\frac{IA\cdot IC}{IB\cdot ID}=\frac{e+g}{f+h}$$

where e, f, g and h are the tangent lengths at A, B, C and D respectively. Combining the first equality with a previous property, the "vertex centroid" of the tangential quadrilateral coincides with the incenter if and only if the incenter is the midpoint of the line segment connecting the midpoints of the diagonals.

If a four-bar linkage is made in the form of a tangential quadrilateral, then it will remain tangential no matter how the linkage is flexed, provided the quadrilateral remains convex. (Thus, for example, if a square is deformed into a rhombus it remains tangential, though to a smaller incircle). If one side is held in a fixed position, then as the quadrilateral is flexed, the incenter traces out a circle of radius $\sqrt{abcd}/s$ where a,b,c,d are the sides in sequence and s is the semiperimeter.

== Characterizations in the four subtriangles ==
Chao and Simeonov's characterization in terms of the radii of circles within each of four triangles

In the nonoverlapping triangles APB, BPC, CPD, DPA formed by the diagonals in a convex quadrilateral ABCD, where the diagonals intersect at P, there are the following characterizations of tangential quadrilaterals.

Let r_{1}, r_{2}, r_{3}, and r_{4} denote the radii of the incircles in the four triangles APB, BPC, CPD, and DPA respectively. Chao and Simeonov proved that the quadrilateral is tangential if and only if

$$\frac{1}{r_1}+\frac{1}{r_3}=\frac{1}{r_2}+\frac{1}{r_4}.$$

This characterization had already been proved five years earlier by Vaynshtejn. In the solution to his problem, a similar characterization was given by Vasilyev and Senderov. If h_{1}, h_{2}, h_{3}, and h_{4} denote the altitudes in the same four triangles (from the diagonal intersection to the sides of the quadrilateral), then the quadrilateral is tangential if and only if

$$\frac{1}{h_1}+\frac{1}{h_3}=\frac{1}{h_2}+\frac{1}{h_4}.$$

Another similar characterization concerns the exradii r_{a}, r_{b}, r_{c}, and r_{d} in the same four triangles (the four excircles are each tangent to one side of the quadrilateral and the extensions of its diagonals). A quadrilateral is tangential if and only if

$$\frac{1}{r_a}+\frac{1}{r_c}=\frac{1}{r_b}+\frac{1}{r_d}.$$

If R_{1}, R_{2}, R_{3}, and R_{4} denote the radii in the circumcircles of triangles APB, BPC, CPD, and DPA respectively, then the quadrilateral ABCD is tangential if and only if

$$R_1+R_3=R_2+R_4.$$

In 1996, Vaynshtejn was probably the first to prove another beautiful characterization of tangential quadrilaterals, that has later appeared in several magazines and websites. It states that when a convex quadrilateral is divided into four nonoverlapping triangles by its two diagonals, then the incenters of the four triangles are concyclic if and only if the quadrilateral is tangential. In fact, the incenters form an orthodiagonal cyclic quadrilateral. A related result is that the incircles can be exchanged for the excircles to the same triangles (tangent to the sides of the quadrilateral and the extensions of its diagonals). Thus a convex quadrilateral is tangential if and only if the excenters in these four excircles are the vertices of a cyclic quadrilateral.

A convex quadrilateral ABCD, with diagonals intersecting at P, is tangential if and only if the four excenters in triangles APB, BPC, CPD, and DPA opposite the vertices B and D are concyclic. If R_{a}, R_{b}, R_{c}, and R_{d} are the exradii in the triangles APB, BPC, CPD, and DPA respectively opposite the vertices B and D, then another condition is that the quadrilateral is tangential if and only if

$$\frac{1}{R_a}+\frac{1}{R_c}=\frac{1}{R_b}+\frac{1}{R_d}.$$

Further, a convex quadrilateral ABCD with diagonals intersecting at P is tangential if and only if

$$\frac{a}{\triangle(APB)}+\frac{c}{\triangle(CPD)}=\frac{b}{\triangle(BPC)}+\frac{d}{\triangle(DPA)}$$

where ∆(APB) is the area of triangle APB.

Denote the segments that the diagonal intersection P divides diagonal AC into as AP = p_{1} and PC = p_{2}, and similarly P divides diagonal BD into segments BP = q_{1} and PD = q_{2}. Then the quadrilateral is tangential if and only if any one of the following equalities are true:

$$ap_2q_2 + cp_1q_1 = bp_1q_2 + dp_2q_1$$

or

$$\frac{(p_1+q_1-a)(p_2+q_2-c)}{(p_1+q_1+a)(p_2+q_2+c)}=\frac{(p_2+q_1-b)(p_1+q_2-d)}{(p_2+q_1+b)(p_1+q_2+d)}$$

or

$$\frac{(a+p_1-q_1)(c+p_2-q_2)}{(a-p_1+q_1)(c-p_2+q_2)}=\frac{(b+p_2-q_1)(d+p_1-q_2)}{(b-p_2+q_1)(d-p_1+q_2)}.$$

== Conditions for a tangential quadrilateral to be another type of quadrilateral ==
=== Rhombus ===
A tangential quadrilateral is a rhombus if and only if its opposite angles are equal.

=== Kite ===
A tangential quadrilateral is a kite if and only if any one of the following conditions is true:

- The area is one half the product of the diagonals.
- The diagonals are perpendicular.
- The two line segments connecting opposite points of tangency have equal lengths.
- One pair of opposite tangent lengths have equal lengths.
- The bimedians have equal lengths.
- The products of opposite sides are equal.
- The center of the incircle lies on the diagonal that is the axis of symmetry.

=== Bicentric quadrilateral ===
A bicentric quadrilateral ABCD: the contact quadrilateral (pink) is orthodiagonal.

If the incircle is tangent to the sides AB, BC, CD, DA at W, X, Y, Z respectively, then a tangential quadrilateral ABCD is also cyclic (and hence bicentric) if and only if any one of the following conditions hold:

- WY is perpendicular to XZ
- $AW\cdot CY=BW\cdot DY$
- $\frac{AC}{BD}=\frac{AW+CY}{BX+DZ}$

The first of these three means that the contact quadrilateral WXYZ is an orthodiagonal quadrilateral.

A tangential quadrilateral is bicentric if and only if its inradius is greater than that of any other tangential quadrilateral having the same sequence of side lengths.

=== Tangential trapezoid ===
If the incircle is tangent to the sides AB and CD at W and Y respectively, then a tangential quadrilateral ABCD is also a trapezoid with parallel sides AB and CD if and only if

$$AW\cdot DY=BW\cdot CY$$

and AD and BC are the parallel sides of a trapezoid if and only if

$$AW\cdot BW=CY\cdot DY.$$

== See also ==
- Apollonius quadrilateral, where products rather than sums of opposite sides are equal
- Ex-tangential quadrilateral, a quadrilateral tangent to a circle outside it
