= Tangential trapezoid =

Trapezoid whose sides are all tangent to the same circle

A tangential trapezoid.

In Euclidean geometry, a tangential trapezoid, also called a circumscribed trapezoid, is a trapezoid whose four sides are all tangent to a circle within the trapezoid: the incircle or inscribed circle. It is the special case of a tangential quadrilateral in which at least one pair of opposite sides are parallel. As for other trapezoids, the parallel sides are called the bases and the other two sides the legs. The legs can be equal (see isosceles tangential trapezoid below), but they don't have to be.

== Special cases ==
Examples of tangential trapezoids are rhombi and squares.

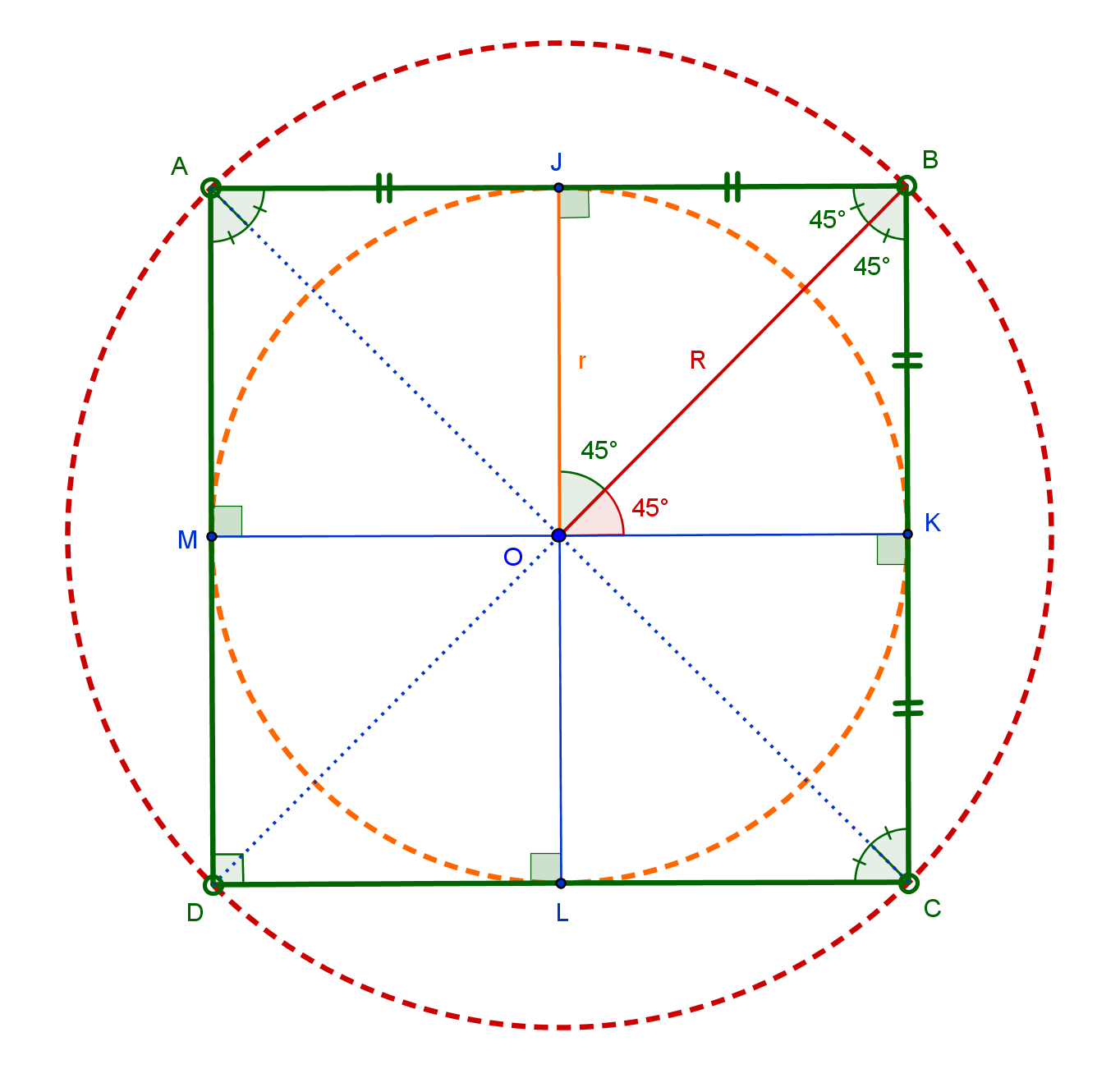

== Characterization ==
If the incircle is tangent to the sides AB and CD at W and Y respectively, then a tangential quadrilateral ABCD is also a trapezoid with parallel sides AB and CD if and only if

$$\overline{AW} \cdot \overline{DY} = \overline{BW} \cdot \overline{CY}$$

and AD and BC are the parallel sides of a trapezoid if and only if

$$\overline{AW} \cdot \overline{BW} = \overline{CY} \cdot \overline{DY}.$$

== Area ==
As for a general tangential quadrilateral, the area of a tangential trapezoid equals the product of its inradius and its semiperimeter – the dashed edges also show that the total length of even-numbered edges equal that of odd-numbered ones

The formula for the area of a trapezoid can be simplified using Pitot's theorem to get a formula for the area of a tangential trapezoid. If the bases have lengths a, b, and any one of the other two sides has length c, then the area K is given by the formula (This formula can be used only in cases where the bases are parallel.)

$$K=\frac{a+b}{|b-a|}\sqrt{ab(a-c)(c-b)}.$$

The area can be expressed in terms of the tangent lengths e, f, g, h as

$$K=\sqrt[4]{efgh}(e+f+g+h).$$

== Inradius ==
Using the same notations as for the area, the radius in the incircle is

$$r=\frac{K}{a+b}=\frac{\sqrt{ab(a-c)(c-b)}}{|b-a|}.$$

The diameter of the incircle is equal to the height of the tangential trapezoid.

The inradius can also be expressed in terms of the tangent lengths as

$$r=\sqrt[4]{efgh}.$$

Moreover, if the tangent lengths e, f, g, h emanate respectively from vertices A, B, C, D and AB is parallel to DC, then

$$r=\sqrt{eh}=\sqrt{fg}.$$

== Properties of the incenter ==
If the incircle is tangent to the bases at P, Q, then P, I, Q are collinear, where I is the incenter.

The angles ∠ AID and ∠ BIC in a tangential trapezoid ABCD, with bases AB and DC, are right angles.

The incenter lies on the median (also called the midsegment; that is, the segment connecting the midpoints of the legs).

== Other properties ==
The median (midsegment) of a tangential trapezoid equals one fourth of the perimeter of the trapezoid. It also equals half the sum of the bases, as in all trapezoids.

If two circles are drawn, each with a diameter coinciding with the legs of a tangential trapezoid, then these two circles are tangent to each other.

== Right tangential trapezoid ==
A right tangential trapezoid.

A right tangential trapezoid is a tangential trapezoid where two adjacent angles are right angles. If the bases have lengths a, b, then the inradius is

$$r=\frac{ab}{a+b}.$$

Thus the diameter of the incircle is the harmonic mean of the bases.

The right tangential trapezoid has the area

$$\displaystyle K=ab$$

and its perimeter P is

$$\displaystyle P=2(a+b).$$

== Isosceles tangential trapezoid ==
Every isosceles tangential trapezoid is bicentric.

An isosceles tangential trapezoid is a tangential trapezoid where the legs are equal. Since an isosceles trapezoid is cyclic, an isosceles tangential trapezoid is a bicentric quadrilateral. That is, it has both an incircle and a circumcircle.

If the bases are a, b, then the inradius is given by

$$r=\tfrac{1}{2}\sqrt{ab}.$$

To derive this formula was a simple Sangaku problem from Japan. From Pitot's theorem it follows that the lengths of the legs are half the sum of the bases. Since the diameter of the incircle is the square root of the product of the bases, an isosceles tangential trapezoid gives a nice geometric interpretation of the arithmetic mean and geometric mean of the bases as the length of a leg and the diameter of the incircle respectively.

The area K of an isosceles tangential trapezoid with bases a, b is given by

$$K=\tfrac{1}{2}\sqrt{ab}(a+b).$$
