= Isosceles trapezoid =

Trapezoid symmetrical about an axis

- Isosceles trapezoid with axis of symmetry
- Type: quadrilateral, trapezoid
- Edges and vertices: 4
- Properties: convex, cyclic
- Dual polygon: Kite

In Euclidean geometry, an isosceles trapezoid or isosceles trapezium (Note: Trapezoid is the term used in American English, while in British English, it is a trapezium; see Trapezoid § Etymology.) is a convex quadrilateral with a line of symmetry bisecting one pair of opposite sides. It is a special case of a trapezoid. Alternatively, it can be defined as a trapezoid in which both legs and both base angles are of equal measure, or as a trapezoid whose diagonals have equal length. Note that a non-rectangular parallelogram is not an isosceles trapezoid because of the second condition, or because it has no line of symmetry. In any isosceles trapezoid, two opposite sides (the bases) are parallel, and the two other sides (the legs) are of equal length (properties shared with the parallelogram), and the diagonals have equal length. The base angles of an isosceles trapezoid are equal in measure (there are in fact two pairs of equal base angles, where one base angle is the supplementary angle of a base angle at the other base).

== Special cases ==
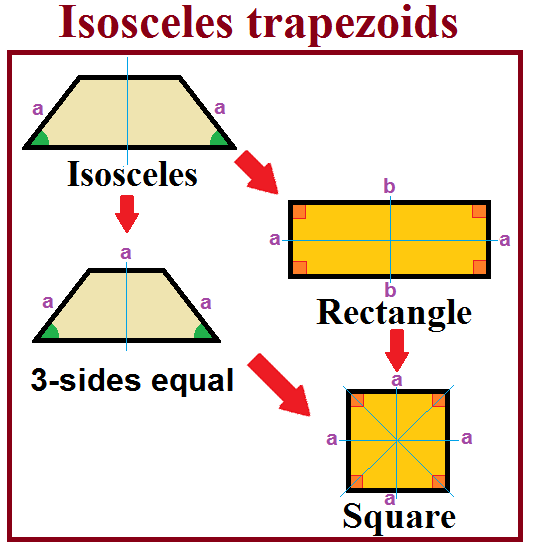
Special cases of isosceles trapezoids

A trapezoid is defined as a quadrilateral having exactly one pair of parallel sides, with the other pair of opposite sides non-parallel. However, the trapezoid can be defined inclusively as any quadrilateral with at least one pair of parallel sides. The latter definition is hierarchical, allowing the parallelogram, rhombus, and square to be included as its special case. In the case of an isosceles trapezoid, it is an acute trapezoid wherein two adjacent angles are acute on its longer base. Both rectangles and squares are usually considered to be special cases of isosceles trapezoids, whereas parallelograms are not. Another special case is a trilateral trapezoid or a trisosceles trapezoid, where two legs and one base have equal lengths; it can be considered as the dissection of a regular hexagon.

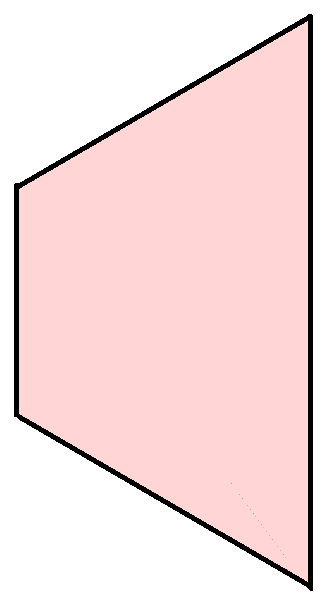
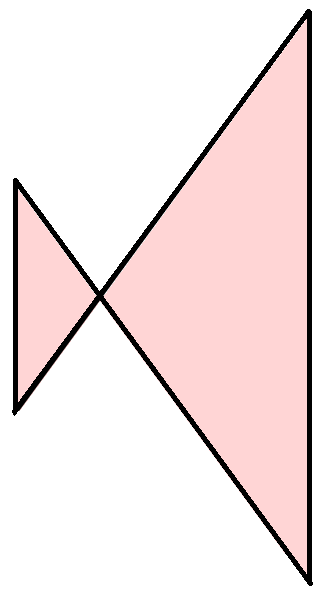
Isosceles trapezoid, crossed isosceles trapezoid, and antiparallelogram

Any non-self-crossing quadrilateral with exactly one axis of symmetry must be either an isosceles trapezoid or a kite. However, if crossings are allowed, the set of symmetric quadrilaterals must be expanded to include also the crossed isosceles trapezoids (crossed quadrilaterals in which the crossed sides are of equal length and the other sides are parallel) and antiparallelograms (crossed quadrilaterals in which opposite sides have equal length). Every antiparallelogram has an isosceles trapezoid as its convex hull, and may be formed from the diagonals and non-parallel sides (or either pair of opposite sides in the case of a rectangle) of an isosceles trapezoid.

== Characterizations ==
If a quadrilateral is known to be a trapezoid, it is not sufficient just to check that the legs have the same length in order to know that it is an isosceles trapezoid, since a rhombus is a special case of a trapezoid with legs of equal length, but is not an isosceles trapezoid as it lacks a line of symmetry through the midpoints of opposite sides.

Any one of the following properties distinguishes an isosceles trapezoid from other trapezoids:

- The diagonals have the same length.
- The base angles have the same measure.
- The segment that joins the midpoints of the parallel sides is perpendicular to them.
- Opposite angles are supplementary, which in turn implies that isosceles trapezoids are cyclic quadrilaterals.
- The diagonals divide each other into segments with lengths that are pairwise equal; in terms of the picture below, $AE = DE$, $BE = CE$, and $AE \neq CE$ if one wishes to exclude rectangles).

== Formula ==
An isosceles trapezoid with variables. Here $AD$ and $BC$ are the bases of, $AC$ and $BD$ are the diagonals of, and $E$ is the intersection between two diagonals of an isosceles trapezoid.

In this article, let $ABCD$ be an isosceles trapezoid. The edges $AD$ and $BC$ are the bases of, $AC$ and $BD$ are the diagonals of, and $E$ is the intersection between two diagonals of an isosceles trapezoid.

=== Angles ===
In an isosceles trapezoid, the base angles have the same measure pairwise. In the picture below, angles $\angle ABC$ and $\angle DCB$ are obtuse angles of the same measure, while angles $\angle BAD$ and $\angle CDA$ are acute angles, also of the same measure. Since the lines $AD$ and $BC$ are parallel, angles adjacent to opposite bases are supplementary. That is:
$$\angle ABC + \angle BAD = 180^\circ.$$

=== Diagonals and height ===
The diagonals of an isosceles trapezoid have the same length; that is, every isosceles trapezoid is an equidiagonal quadrilateral. Moreover, the diagonals divide each other in the same proportions. As pictured, the diagonals $AC$ and $BD$ have the same length $AC = BD$ and divide each other into segments of the same length $AE = DE$ and $BE = CE$.

The ratio in which each diagonal is divided is equal to the ratio of the lengths of the parallel sides that they intersect, that is,
$$\frac{AE}{EC} = \frac{DE}{EB} = \frac{AD}{BC}.$$

The length of each diagonal is, according to Ptolemy's theorem, given by
$$p=\sqrt{ab+c^2}$$
where $a$ and $b$ are the lengths of the parallel sides $AD$ and $BC$, and $c$ is the length of each leg $AB$ and $CD$.

The height is, according to the Pythagorean theorem, given by
$$h=\sqrt{p^2-\left(\frac{a+b}{2}\right)^2}=\tfrac{1}{2}\sqrt{4c^2-(a-b)^2}.$$

The distance from point $E$ to base $AD$ is given by
$$d=\frac{ah}{a+b}$$
where $a$ and $b$ are the lengths of the parallel sides $AD$ and $BC$, and $h$ is the height of the trapezoid.

=== Area ===
The area of an isosceles (or any) trapezoid is equal to the average of the lengths of the base and top (the parallel sides) times the height. If the edges $AD = a$ and $BC = b$, and the height $h$ is the length of a line segment between $AD$ and $BC$ that is perpendicular to them, then the area $K$ is
$$K = \tfrac12\left(a+b\right) h.$$

If instead of the height of the trapezoid, the common length of the legs $AB = CD = c$ is known, then the area can be computed using Brahmagupta's formula for the area of a cyclic quadrilateral, which, with two sides equal, simplifies to
$$K = (s-c)\sqrt{(s-a)(s-b)},$$
where $s = \tfrac{1}{2}(a + b + 2c)$ is the semi-perimeter of the trapezoid. This formula is analogous to Heron's formula to compute the area of a triangle. The previous formula for area can also be written as
$$K = \frac{a+b}{4} \sqrt{(a-b+2c)(b-a+2c)}.$$

=== Circumradius ===
The radius in the circumscribed circle is given by
$$R=c\sqrt{\frac{ab+c^2}{4c^2-(a-b)^2}}.$$

In a rectangle where $a = b$, this is simplified to $R=\tfrac{1}{2}\sqrt{a^2+c^2}$.

== Duality ==
A kite and its dual isosceles trapezoid

Kites and isosceles trapezoids are dual to each other, meaning that there is a correspondence between them that reverses the dimension of their parts, taking vertices to sides and sides to vertices. From any kite, the inscribed circle is tangent to its four sides at the four vertices of an isosceles trapezoid. For any isosceles trapezoid, tangent lines to the circumscribing circle at its four vertices form the four sides of a kite. This correspondence can also be seen as an example of polar reciprocation, a general method for corresponding points with lines and vice versa given a fixed circle. Although they do not touch the circle, the four vertices of the kite are reciprocal in this sense to the four sides of the isosceles trapezoid. The features of kites and isosceles trapezoids that correspond to each other under this duality are compared in the table below.

| Isosceles trapezoid | Kite |
|---|---|
| Two pairs of equal adjacent angles | Two pairs of equal adjacent sides |
| Two equal opposite sides | Two equal opposite angles |
| Two opposite sides with a shared perpendicular bisector | Two opposite angles with a shared angle bisector |
| An axis of symmetry through two opposite sides | An axis of symmetry through two opposite angles |
| Circumscribed circle through all vertices | Inscribed circle tangent to all sides |

== See also ==
- Isosceles tangential trapezoid
