= Henri Pitot =

French hydraulic engineer (1695–1771)

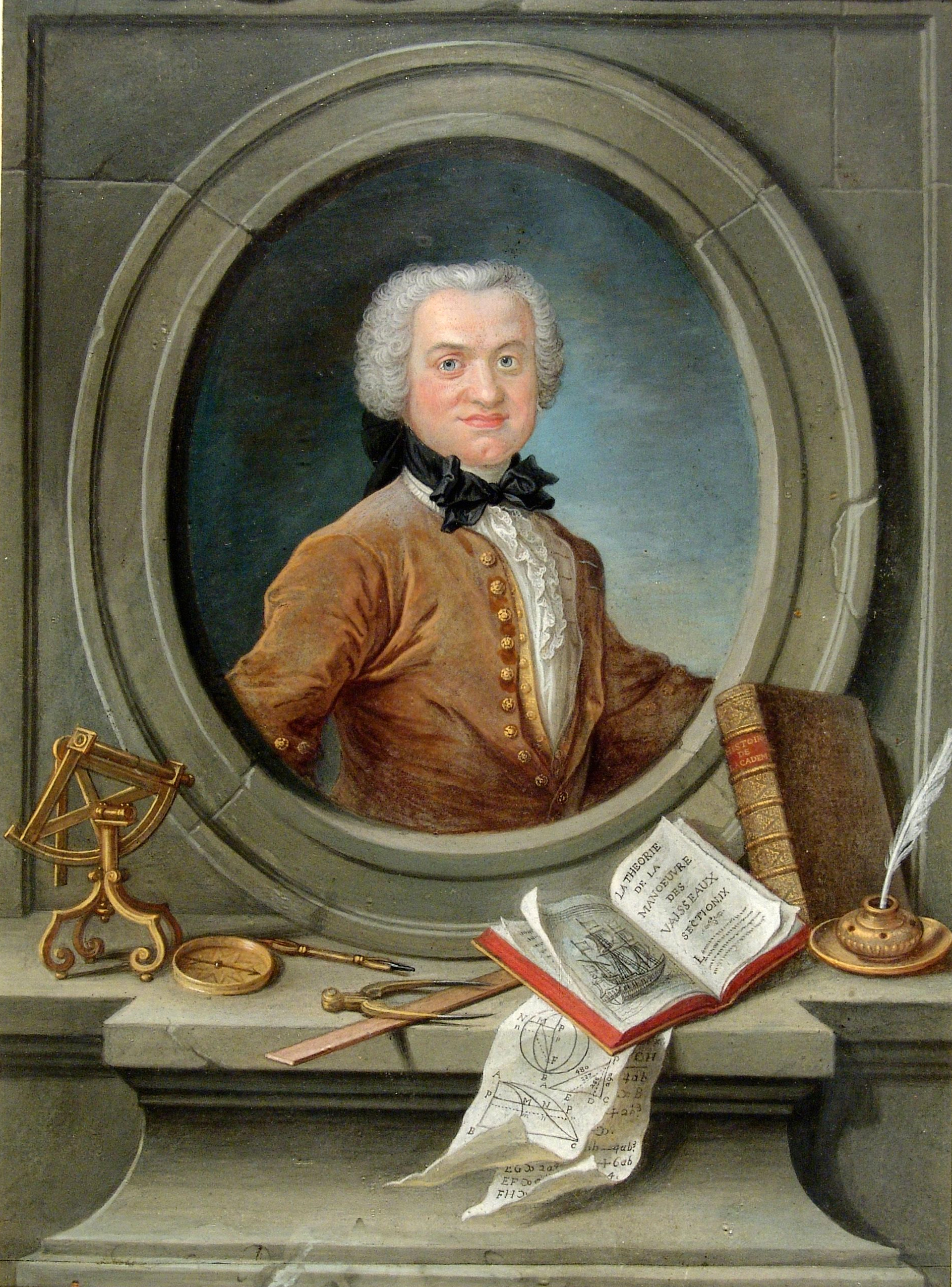
- Born: 3 May 1695; Aramon, Languedoc, France
- Died: 27 December 1771 (aged 76); Aramon, Languedoc, France
- Known for: Pitot tube Pitot pressure Pitot theorem
- Scientific career
- Fields: Hydraulics

Henri Pitot (/ˈpiːtoʊ/ PEE-toh; French: [ɑ̃ʁi pito]; May 3, 1695 – December 27, 1771) was a French hydraulic engineer and the inventor of the Pitot tube.

== Work ==
Henri Pitot established the relationship between fluid velocity and stagnation pressure in 1732 while investigating the flow of the Seine. In a Pitot tube, the fluid entering the inner tube is brought to rest, producing a stagnation pressure that can be measured using a pressure gauge or manometer. Alternatively, this pressure may be transmitted to an enclosed chamber, such as the float bowl of a carburetor. When a manometer contains the same fluid as the flow being measured, the difference in fluid-column height corresponding to the stagnation and static pressures is proportional to the square of the flow velocity.

He rose to fame with the design of the Aqueduc de Saint-Clément near Montpellier (the construction lasted thirteen years), and the extension of Pont du Gard in Nîmes. In 1724, he became a member of the French Academy of Sciences, and in 1740 a fellow of the Royal Society.

The Pitot theorem of plane geometry is named after him.

Rue Henri Pitot in Carcassonne is named after him.
