= Harmonic quadrilateral =

Cyclic quadrilateral in which the products of opposite side lengths are equal

Two constructions of a harmonic quadrilateral. Left, the four points where lines through a given point (red) and the vertices of a square (light red) cross the circumcircle of the square. Right, extending a triangle (dark blue) by the point where a symmedian line (red) crosses its circumcircle.

In Euclidean geometry, a harmonic quadrilateral is a quadrilateral whose four vertices lie on a circle, and whose pairs of opposite edges have equal products of lengths.

Harmonic quadrilaterals have also been called harmonic quadrangles. They are the images of squares under Möbius transformations. Every triangle can be extended to a harmonic quadrilateral by adding another vertex, in three ways. The notion of Brocard points of triangles can be generalized to these quadrilaterals.

== Definitions and characterizations ==
A harmonic quadrilateral is a quadrilateral that can be inscribed in a circle (a cyclic quadrilateral) and in which the products of the lengths of opposite sides are equal (an Apollonius quadrilateral). Equivalently, it is a quadrilateral that can be obtained as a Möbius transformation of the vertices of a square, as these transformations preserve both the inscribability of a square and the cross ratio of its vertices. Four points in the complex plane define a harmonic quadrilateral when their complex cross ratio is $-1$; this is only possible for points inscribed in a circle, and in this case, it equals the real cross ratio.

== Constructions ==
For any point $p$ in the plane, the four lines connecting $p$ to each vertex of the square cut the circumcircle of the square in the four points of a harmonic quadrilateral.

Every triangle can be extended to a harmonic quadrilateral in three different ways, by adding a fourth vertex to the triangle, at the point where one of the three symmedians of the triangle cross its circumcircle. Each symmedian is the line through one vertex of the triangle and through the crossing point of the two tangent lines to the circumcircle at the other two vertices.

== Properties ==
The definition of the Brocard points of a triangle can be extended to harmonic quadrilaterals. A Brocard point of a polygon has the property that the line segments connecting the Brocard to the polygon vertices all form equal angles with the adjacent polygon sides. Each triangle has two Brocard points, one that forms equal angles with the polygon sides adjacent in the clockwise direction from each vertex, and another for the counterclockwise direction. The same property is true for the harmonic quadrilaterals, uniquely among cyclic quadrilaterals.

== See also ==
- Right kite, the special case of a cyclic quadrilateral in which both pairs of opposite sides have the same two lengths
