= Pitot theorem =

In a quadrilateral with all sides tangent to a circle, sums of opposite sides are equal

$|PA| = |PB|$

$$\begin{align}&|AB| + |CD|\\ =&(a+b)+(c+d)\\=&(b+c)+(a+d)\\=&|BC| + |DA| \end{align}$$

The Pitot theorem in geometry states that in a tangential quadrilateral the two pairs of opposite sides have the same total length. It is named after French engineer Henri Pitot.

== Statement and converse ==
A tangential quadrilateral is usually defined as a convex quadrilateral for which all four sides are tangent to the same inscribed circle. Pitot's theorem states that, for these quadrilaterals, the two sums of lengths of opposite sides are the same. Both sums of lengths equal the semiperimeter of the quadrilateral.

The converse implication is also true: whenever a convex quadrilateral has pairs of opposite sides with the same sums of lengths, it has an inscribed circle. Therefore, this is an exact characterization: the tangential quadrilaterals are exactly the quadrilaterals with equal sums of opposite side lengths.

== Proof idea ==
One way to prove the Pitot's theorem is to divide the sides of any given tangential quadrilateral at the points where its inscribed circle touches each side. This divides the four sides into eight segments, between a vertex of the quadrilateral and a point of tangency with the circle. Any two of these segments that meet at the same vertex have the same length, forming a pair of equal-length segments. Any two opposite sides have one segment from each of these pairs. Therefore, the four segments in two opposite sides have the same lengths, and the same sum of lengths, as the four segments in the other two opposite sides.

One way to prove the converse of the theorem is to use three sides to construct the circle. Namely, construct the angle bisectors at B and C and let them intersect at point O - this will be the center of the circle. Let P, Q and R be the unique points on (respectively) AB, BC and CD which are closest to O. Lines from O to each of these points will meet the respective lines at a right angle. The distance |OQ| will be the radius of the circle. Using congruency tests (AAS) the distances |OP|, |OQ| and |OR| will all the same. Thus the sides AB, BC and CD are all tangential to the constructed circle.

Assume (aiming for a contradiction) that the fourth side (AD) is not tangent to the circle. Construct a new side from A that is tangential to the circle. Let this meet the line through CD at point E (it can be internal or external to the quadrilateral). ABCE is a tangential quadrilateral and so by Pitot's theorem |AB| + |CE| = |BC| + |EA|. We also have from the premise that |AB| + |CD| = |BC| + |DA|. Taking differences we get |CE| - |CD| = |EA| - |DA| which in general becomes max(|EA|,|DA|) - min(|EA|,|DA|) = ||CE|-|CD|| = |ED|. So max(|EA|,|DA|) = min(|EA|,|DA|) + |ED|. This implies the triangle with vertices ADE is degenerate and so AD is tangent to the circle generating the contradiction as desired.

In the bottom two figures, the dashed edges show that the total length of even-numbered edges equal that of odd-numbered ones

== History ==
Henri Pitot proved his theorem in 1725, whereas the converse was proved by the Swiss mathematician Jakob Steiner in 1846.

== Generalization ==
Pitot's theorem generalizes to tangential $2n$-gons, in which case the two sums of alternate sides are equal. The same proof idea applies.
