= Diagonal =

Line segment joining two nonconsecutive vertices of a polygon or polyhedron

The diagonals of a cube with side length 1. AC' (shown in blue) is a space diagonal with length $\sqrt 3$, while AC (shown in red) is a face diagonal and has length $\sqrt 2$.

Horizontal (left), vertical (center) and diagonal (right) double arrows.

In geometry, a diagonal is a line segment joining two vertices of a polygon or polyhedron, when those vertices are not on the same edge. Informally, any sloping line is called diagonal. The word diagonal derives from the ancient Greek διαγώνιος diagonios, "from corner to corner" (from διά- dia-, "through", "across" and γωνία gonia, "corner", related to gony "knee"); it was used by both Strabo and Euclid to refer to a line connecting two vertices of a rhombus or cuboid, and later adopted into Latin as diagonus ("slanting line").

== Polygons ==
As applied to a polygon, a diagonal is a line segment joining any two non-consecutive vertices. Therefore, a quadrilateral has two diagonals, joining opposite pairs of vertices. For any convex polygon, all the diagonals are inside the polygon, but for re-entrant polygons, some diagonals are outside of the polygon.

Any n-sided polygon (n ≥ 3), convex or concave, has $\tfrac{n(n-3)}{2}$ total diagonals, as each vertex has diagonals to all other vertices except itself and the two adjacent vertices, or n − 3 diagonals, and each diagonal is shared by two vertices.

In general, a regular n-sided polygon has $\left\lfloor\frac {n-2}{2}\right\rfloor$ distinct diagonals in length, which follows the pattern 1,1,2,2,3,3... starting from a square.

Sides	Diagonals
3	0
4	2
5	5
6	9
7	14
8	20
9	27
10	35

Sides	Diagonals
11	44
12	54
13	65
14	77
15	90
16	104
17	119
18	135

Sides	Diagonals
19	152
20	170
21	189
22	209
23	230
24	252
25	275
26	299

Sides	Diagonals
27	324
28	350
29	377
30	405
31	434
32	464
33	495
34	527

Sides	Diagonals
35	560
36	594
37	629
38	665
39	702
40	740
41	779
42	819

=== Regions formed by diagonals ===
In a convex polygon, if no three diagonals are concurrent at a single point in the interior, the number of regions that the diagonals divide the interior into is given by

$$\binom n4 + \binom {n-1}2 = \frac{(n-1)(n-2)(n^2-3n+12)}{24}.$$

For n-gons with n=3, 4, ... the number of regions is

1, 4, 11, 25, 50, 91, 154, 246...

This is OEIS sequence A006522.

=== Intersections of diagonals ===
If no three diagonals of a convex polygon are concurrent at a point in the interior, the number of interior intersections of diagonals is given by $\textstyle \binom n4$. This holds, for example, for any regular polygon with an odd number of sides. The formula follows from the fact that each intersection is uniquely determined by the four endpoints of the two intersecting diagonals: the number of intersections is thus the number of combinations of the n vertices four at a time.

=== Regular polygons ===
Although the number of distinct diagonals in a polygon increases as its number of sides increases, the length of any diagonal can be calculated.

In a regular n-gon with side length a, the length of the xth shortest distinct diagonal is:

$$\sin \left(\frac{\pi(x+1)}{n}\right) \csc \left(\frac{\pi}{n}\right) \cdot a$$

This formula shows that as the number of sides approaches infinity, the xth shortest diagonal approaches the length $(x+1)a$. Additionally, the formula for the shortest diagonal simplifies in the case of x = 1:

$$\sin \left(\frac{2\pi}{n}\right) \csc \left(\frac{\pi}{n}\right) \cdot a = 2\cos \left(\frac{\pi}{n}\right) \cdot a$$

If the number of sides is even, the longest diagonal will be equivalent to the diameter of the polygon's circumcircle because the long diagonals all intersect each other at the polygon's center.

Special cases include:

A square has two diagonals of equal length, which intersect at the center of the square. The ratio of a diagonal to a side is $\sqrt{2}\approx 1.414.$

A regular pentagon has five diagonals all of the same length. The ratio of a diagonal to a side is the golden ratio, $\frac{1+\sqrt{5}}{2}\approx 1.618.$

==== Short and long diagonals ====
A regular hexagon has nine diagonals: the six shorter ones are equal to each other in length; the three longer ones are equal to each other in length and intersect each other at the center of the hexagon. The ratio of a long diagonal to a side is 2, and the ratio of a short diagonal to a side is $\sqrt{3}$.

A regular heptagon has 14 diagonals. The seven shorter ones equal each other, and the seven longer ones equal each other. The reciprocal of the side equals the sum of the reciprocals of a short and a long diagonal.

== Polyhedra ==
A polyhedron (a solid object in three-dimensional space, bounded by two-dimensional faces) may have two different types of diagonals: face diagonals on the various faces, connecting non-adjacent vertices on the same face; and space diagonals, entirely in the interior of the polyhedron (except for the endpoints on the vertices).

== Higher dimensions ==
=== N-Cube ===
The lengths of an n-dimensional hypercube's diagonals can be calculated by mathematical induction. The longest diagonal of an n-cube is $\sqrt{n}$. Additionally, there are $2^{n-1}\binom{n}{x+1}$ of the xth shortest diagonal. As an example, a 5-cube would have the diagonals:

Diagonal length	Number of diagonals
√2	160
√3	160
2	80
√5	16

Its total number of diagonals is 416. In general, an n-cube has a total of $2^{n-1}(2^n-n-1)$ diagonals. This follows from the more general form of $\frac{v(v-1)}{2}-e$ which describes the total number of face and space diagonals in convex polytopes. Here, v represents the number of vertices and e represents the number of edges.

== Geometry ==
By analogy, the subset of the Cartesian product X×X of any set X with itself, consisting of all pairs $(x,x)$, is called the diagonal, and is the graph of the equality relation on X or equivalently the graph of the identity function from X to X. This plays an important part in geometry; for example, the fixed points of a mapping F from X to itself may be obtained by intersecting the graph of F with the diagonal.

In geometric studies, the idea of intersecting the diagonal with itself is common, not directly, but by perturbing it within an equivalence class. This is related at a deep level with the Euler characteristic and the zeros of vector fields. For example, the circle S^{1} has Betti numbers 1, 1, 0, 0, 0, and therefore Euler characteristic 0. A geometric way of expressing this is to look at the diagonal on the two-torus S^{1}×S^{1} and observe that it can move off itself by the small motion (θ, θ) to (θ, θ + ε). In general, the intersection number of the graph of a function with the diagonal may be computed using homology via the Lefschetz fixed-point theorem; the self-intersection of the diagonal is the special case of the identity function.
