= Midsquare quadrilateral =

Quadrilateral with equal perpendicular diagonals

A midsquare quadrilateral (light blue), with its two equal-length perpendicular diagonals (black) and its midsquare (dark blue)

In elementary geometry, a quadrilateral whose diagonals are perpendicular and of equal length has been called a midsquare quadrilateral (referring to the square formed by its four edge midpoints). These shapes are, by definition, simultaneously equidiagonal quadrilaterals and orthodiagonal quadrilaterals. Older names for the same shape include pseudo-square, and skewsquare.

== Midsquare ==
In any quadrilateral, the four edge midpoints form a parallelogram, the Varignon parallelogram, whose sides are parallel to the diagonals and half their length. It follows that, in an equidiagonal and orthodiagonal quadrilateral, the sides of the Varignon parallelogram are equal-length and perpendicular; that is, it is a square. For the same reason, a quadrilateral whose Varignon parallelogram is square must be equidiagonal and orthodiagonal. This characterization motivates the midsquare quadrilateral name for these shapes. A midsquare quadrilateral can be constructed from its midsquare and any one of its vertices. To do so, let the given midsquare have vertices $P, Q, R, S$, and let a vertex $A$ of the midsquare quadrilateral be given. Then the remaining three vertices $B,C,D$ can be constructed by letting $B$ be the reflection of $A$ across $P$ (so that $P$ is the midpoint of segment $AB$, letting $C$ be the reflection of $B$ across $Q$, and letting $D$ be the reflection of $C$ $R$. It will automatically follow that $A$ is the reflection of $D$ across $S$, completing the midsquare quadrilateral.

== Van Aubel and diagonal squares ==
According to Van Aubel's theorem, a midsquare quadrilateral can also be constructed from an arbitrary quadrilateral by placing squares on the four sides of the quadrilateral, exterior to it, and connecting the four centers of the squares.

A midsquare quadrilateral (blue) with two squares having opposite sides as their diagonals (yellow and pink)

For any two opposite sides of a midsquare quadrilateral, the two squares having these sides as their diagonals intersect in a single vertex, called a focus of the quadrilateral. Conversely, if two squares intersect in a vertex, then their two diagonals disjoint from this vertex form two opposite sides of a (possibly non-convex) midsquare quadrilateral. The fact that the resulting quadrilateral has a midsquare can be seen as an instance of the Finsler–Hadwiger theorem. The two foci and the two diagonal midpoints of any midsquare quadrilateral form the vertices of a square. Each focus lies on an angle bisector of the two diagonals and on the perpendicular bisectors of the two sides that are the diagonals of its squares.

The outer four vertices of the four diagonal squares of a midsquare quadrilateral form another midsquare quadrilateral. These are the same four points that would be obtained by applying Van Aubel's theorem to the given midsquare quadrilateral.

== Biggest little quadrilateral ==
Midsquare quadrilaterals whose sides are not longer than the diagonals have the maximum area for their diameter among all quadrilaterals, solving the $n=4$ case of the biggest little polygon problem. The square is one such quadrilateral, but there are infinitely many others.

== Examples ==
example of a midsquare quadrilateral

a midsquare trapezoid

a midsquare kite

a midsquare parallelogram, that is, a square
