= Risk inclination formula =

The risk inclination formula uses the principle of moments, or Varignon's theorem, to calculate the first factorial moment of probability in order to define this center point of balance among all confidence weights (i.e., the point of risk equilibration).

The formal derivation of the RIF is divided into three separate calculations: (1) calculation of 1st factorial moment, (2) calculation of inclination, and (3) calculation of the risk inclination score.

The RIF is a component of the risk inclination model.
