= Inscribed polygon =

An inscribed polygon might refer to any polygon which is inscribed in a shape, especially:

- A cyclic polygon, which is inscribed in a circle (the circumscribed circle)
- A midpoint polygon of another polygon
