= Skew square =

Skew square may refer to:

- Skewsquare, a plane quadrilateral whose edge midpoints form a square
- A three-dimensional skew polygon with four equal edge lengths and angles, such as a cycle of four edges in a regular tetrahedron
- Skew square, for a ring laser, a square of mirrors modified by lifting one mirror out of the plane of the other three
