= Risk inclination model =

Risk inclination (RI) is defined as a mental disposition (i.e., confidence) toward an eventuality (i.e., a predicted state) that has consequences (i.e., either loss or gain). The risk inclination model (RIM) is composed of three constructs: confidence weighting, restricted context, and the risk inclination formula. Each of these constructs connects an outside observer with a respondent's inner state of risk taking toward knowledge certainty.

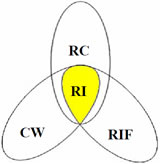
RIM

== Confidence weighting ==
The confidence weighting (CW) construct is concerned with indices that connect an outside observer to the respondent's inner state of knowledge certainty toward specific content. Underpinning the CW construct of the risk inclination model is the individual's experience of coherence or rightness. It is used to calibrate the relationship between a respondent's objective and observable measures of risk taking (i.e., weighted indices toward answer selections) with his or her subjective inner feelings of knowledge certainty (i.e., feelings of rightness).

== Restricted context ==
The restricted context (RC) construct is based on Jean Piaget’s theory of equilibration and allows the outside observer to measure the way a respondent manages competing inner states of knowledge certainty during the application of confidence weights among items within the restricted total point value (TPV) context of the test. RC sets the parameters where risk taking toward knowledge certainty occurs. These parameters are important because they allow an observer to scale and thereby measure the respondent's inner state of equilibration among related levels of knowledge certainty. Equilibration is defined as a self-regulatory process that reflects the biological drive to produce an optimal state of balance between a person's cognitive structures (i.e., inner state) and their environment.

== Risk inclination formula ==
The risk inclination formula (RIF) construct is based upon Varignon's theorem and quantifies feelings of rightness toward knowledge certainty. RIF uses the Principle of Moments or Varignon's Theorem to calculate the first factorial moment of probability in order to define this center point of balance among all confidence weights (i.e., the point of Risk Equilibration). The formal derivation of the RIF is divided into three separate calculations: (1) calculation of the first factorial moment, (2) calculation of inclination, and (3) calculation of the risk inclination score.
