= Midpoint-stretching polygon =

A cyclic polygon (green), its midpoint polygon (red), and its midpoint-stretching polygon (pink)

In geometry, the midpoint-stretching polygon of a cyclic polygon P is another cyclic polygon inscribed in the same circle, the polygon whose vertices are the midpoints of the circular arcs between the vertices of P. It may be derived from the midpoint polygon of P (the polygon whose vertices are the edge midpoints) by placing the polygon in such a way that the circle's center coincides with the origin, and stretching or normalizing the vector representing each vertex of the midpoint polygon to make it have unit length.

== Musical application ==
The midpoint-stretching polygon is also called the shadow of P; when the circle is used to describe a repetitive time sequence and the polygon vertices on it represent the onsets of a drum beat, the shadow represents the set of times when the drummer's hands are highest, and has greater rhythmic evenness than the original rhythm.

== Convergence to regularity ==
The midpoint-stretching polygon of a regular polygon is itself regular, and iterating the midpoint-stretching operation on an arbitrary initial polygon results in a sequence of polygons whose shape converges to that of a regular polygon.
