= Pierre Varignon =

French mathematician

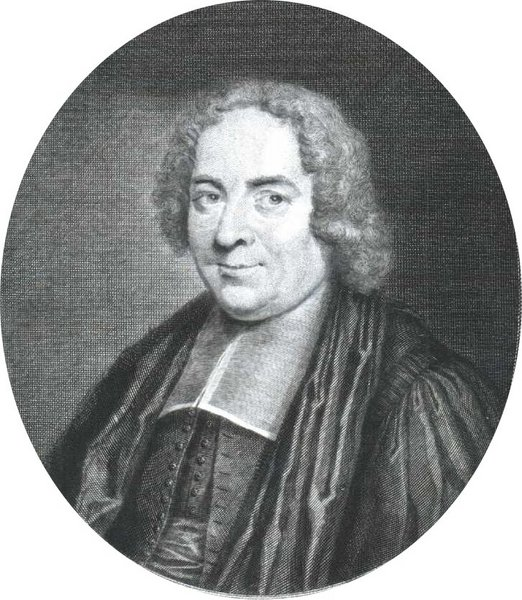
- Born: 1654; Caen, France
- Died: 23 December 1722 (aged 67–68); Paris, France
- Known for: Varignon's theorem Varignon's theorem (mechanics)
- Scientific career
- Fields: Mathematics
- Workplaces: Académie Royale des Sciences, Collège Royal, Collège Mazarin, Berlin Academy, Royal Society
- Doctoral advisor: Nicolas Malebranche
- Doctoral students: Jacques Cassini

Pierre Varignon (French pronunciation: [pjɛʁ vaʁiɲɔ̃]; 1654 – 23 December 1722) was a French mathematician. He was educated at the Jesuit College and the University of Caen, where he received his M.A. in 1682. He took Holy Orders the following year.

Varignon gained his first exposure to mathematics by reading Euclid and then René Descartes' La Géométrie. He became professor of mathematics at the Collège Mazarin in Paris in 1688 and was elected to the Académie Royale des Sciences in the same year. In 1704, he held the departmental chair at Collège Mazarin and also became professor of mathematics at the Collège Royal. He was elected to the Berlin Academy in 1713 and to the Royal Society in 1718. Many of his works were published in Paris in 1725, three years after his death. His lectures at Mazarin were published in Elements de mathematique in 1731.

Varignon was a friend of Isaac Newton, Gottfried Wilhelm Leibniz, and the Bernoulli family. Varignon's principal contributions were to graphic statics and mechanics. Except for Guillaume de l'Hôpital, Varignon was the earliest and strongest French advocate of infinitesimal calculus, and exposed the errors in Michel Rolle's critique thereof. He recognized the importance of a test for the convergence of series, but analytical difficulties prevented his success. Nevertheless, he simplified the proofs of many propositions in mechanics, adapted Leibniz's calculus to the inertial mechanics of Newton's Principia, and treated mechanics in terms of the composition of forces in Projet d'une nouvelle mécanique in 1687. Among Varignon's other works was a 1699 publication concerning the application of differential calculus to fluid flow and to water clocks. In 1690, he created a mechanical explanation of gravitation. In 1702, he applied calculus to spring-driven clocks. In 1704, he invented the U-tube manometer, a device capable of measuring rarefaction in gases.

== Works ==
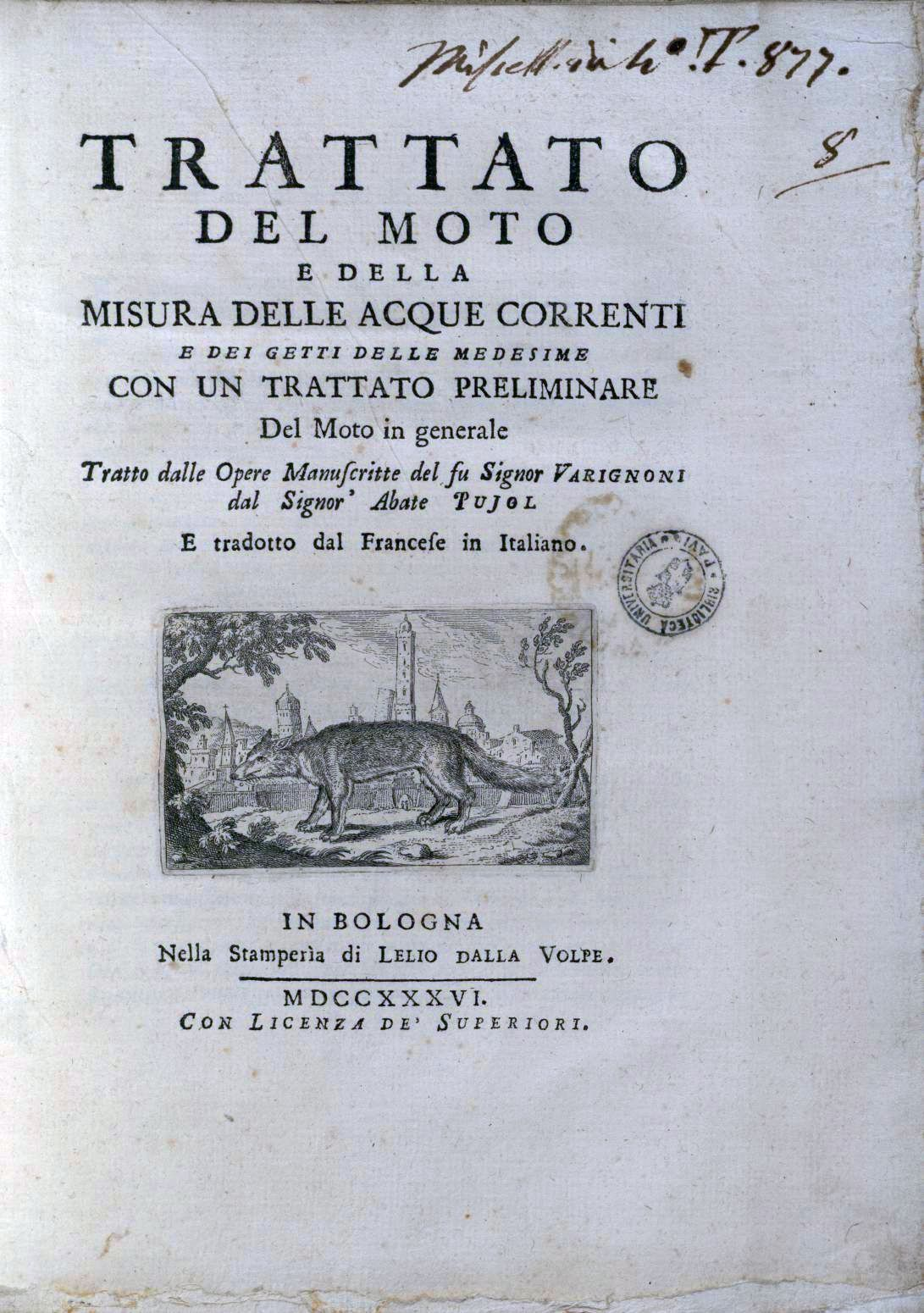
Traité du mouvement et de la mesure des eaux coulantes et jaillissantes, 1736

- Projet d'une nouvelle mechanique (in French). Paris: Edme Martin, veuve. 1687.
- Traité du mouvement et de la mesure des eaux coulantes et jaillissantes (in French). Bologna: Lelio Dalla Volpe. 1736.

== See also ==
- Varignon's theorem
- Varignon's theorem (mechanics)
- List of Roman Catholic scientist-clerics
