= Butterfly theorem =

Theorem about circles

Butterfly theorem: M is the midpoint of X̅Y̅.

In Euclidean geometry, the butterfly theorem is a classical result which can be stated as follows:

Let M be the midpoint of a chord P̅Q̅ of a circle, through which two other chords A̅B̅ and C̅D̅ are drawn; A̅D̅ and B̅C̅ intersect chord P̅Q̅ at X and Y correspondingly. Then M is the midpoint of X̅Y̅.

== Proof ==
Proof of Butterfly theorem Chord P̅Q̅ with known midpoint M. Perpendiculars from Y. Perpendiculars from X. Chords intersecting P̅Q̅ at X, Y, and M. To be proved: M̅X̅ = M̅Y̅.

A formal proof of the theorem is as follows: Let the perpendiculars X̅X̅′ and X̅X̅″ be dropped from the point X on the straight lines A̅M̅ and D̅M̅ respectively. Similarly, let Y̅Y̅′ and Y̅Y̅″ be dropped from the point Y perpendicular to the straight lines B̅M̅ and C̅M̅ respectively.

$$\begin{align}
\triangle MXX' &\sim \triangle MYY', \\[2pt]
\therefore {\overline{MX} \over \overline{MY}} &= {\overline{XX'} \over \overline{YY'}}. \\[8pt]
\triangle MXX'' &\sim \triangle MYY'', \\[2pt]
\therefore {\overline{MX} \over \overline{MY}} &= {\overline{XX''} \over \overline{YY''}}. \\[8pt]
\triangle AXX' &\sim \triangle CYY'', \\[2pt]
\therefore {\overline{XX'} \over \overline{YY''}} &= {\overline{AX} \over \overline{CY}}. \\[8pt]
\triangle DXX'' &\sim \triangle BYY', \\[2pt]
\therefore {\overline{XX''} \over \overline{YY'}} &= {\overline{DX} \over \overline{BY}}.
\end{align}$$

From the preceding equations and the intersecting chords theorem, it can be seen that

$$\begin{align}
\left({\overline{MX} \over \overline{MY}}\right)^2 &= {\overline{XX'} \over \overline{YY'}} \cdot {\overline{XX''} \over \overline{YY''}}, \\[2pt]
&= {\overline{AX} \cdot \overline{DX} \over \overline{CY} \cdot \overline{BY}}, \\[2pt]
&= {\overline{PX} \cdot \overline{QX} \over \overline{PY} \cdot \overline{QY}}, \\[2pt]
&= { \bigl(\overline{PM} - \overline{XM} \bigr) \cdot \bigl(\overline{MQ} + \overline{XM}\bigr) \over \bigl(\overline{PM} + \overline{MY}\bigr) \cdot \bigl(\overline{QM} - \overline{MY}\bigr)}, \\[2pt]
&= { \overline{PM}^2 - \overline{MX}^2 \over \overline{PM}^2 - \overline{MY}^2}, \end{align}$$

since P̅M̅ = M̅Q̅. Thus,

$${ \overline{MX}^2 \over \overline{MY}^2} = {\overline{PM}^2 - \overline{MX}^2 \over \overline{PM}^2 - \overline{MY}^2}.$$

Cross-multiplying the latter equation and cancelling out common terms,

$$\begin{align}
\overline{MX}^2 \cdot \overline{PM}^2 - \overline{MX}^2 \cdot \overline{MY}^2 &= \overline{MY}^2 \cdot \overline{PM}^2 - \overline{MX}^2 \cdot \overline{MY}^2, \\[4pt]
\Rightarrow \quad \overline{MX}^2 \cdot \overline{PM}^2 &= \overline{MY}^2 \cdot \overline{PM}^2, \\[4pt]
\Rightarrow \quad \overline{MX}^2 &= \overline{MY}^2, \\[4pt]
\Rightarrow \quad \overline{MX} &= \overline{MY}.
\end{align}$$

Thus, M is the midpoint of X̅Y̅.

Other proofs exist, including one using projective geometry.

== History ==
Proving the butterfly theorem was posed as a problem by William Wallace in The Gentleman's Mathematical Companion (1803). Three solutions were published in 1804, and in 1805 Sir William Herschel posed the question again in a letter to Wallace. Reverend Thomas Scurr asked the same question again in 1814 in the Gentleman's Diary or Mathematical Repository.
