= Varignon's theorem (mechanics) =

Theorem in classical mechanics

Varignon's theorem is a theorem of French mathematician Pierre Varignon (1654–1722), published in 1687 in his book Projet d'une nouvelle mécanique. The theorem states that the torque of a resultant of two concurrent forces about any point is equal to the algebraic sum of the torques of its components about the same point. In other words, "If many concurrent forces are acting on a body, then the algebraic sum of torques of all the forces about a point in the plane of the forces is equal to the torque of their resultant about the same point."

== Proof ==
Consider a set of $N$ force vectors $\mathbf{f}_1, \mathbf{f}_2, ..., \mathbf{f}_N$ that concur at a point $\mathbf{O}$ in space. Their resultant is:

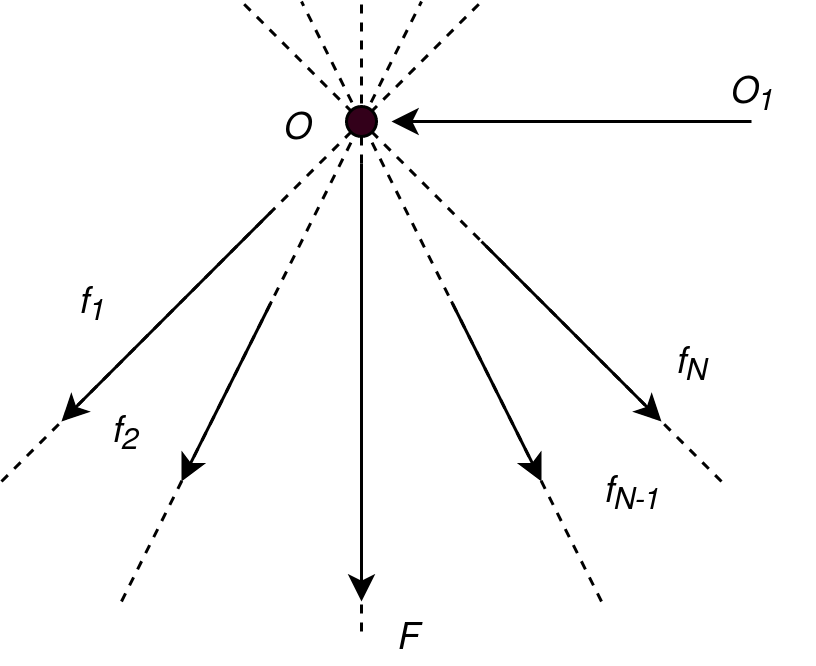

$$\mathbf{F}=\sum_{i=1}^N \mathbf{f}_i$$.

The torque of each vector with respect to some other point $\mathbf{O}_1$ is

$$\mathbf{\Tau}_{O_1}^{\mathbf{f}_i} = (\mathbf{O}-\mathbf{O}_1) \times \mathbf{f}_i$$.

Adding up the torques and pulling out the common factor $(\mathbf{O}-\mathbf{O_{1}})$, one sees that the result may be expressed solely in terms of $\mathbf{F}$, and is in fact the torque of $\mathbf{F}$ with respect to the point $\mathbf{O}_1$:

$$\sum_{i=1}^N \mathbf{\Tau}_{O_1}^{\mathbf{f}_i}
= (\mathbf{O}-\mathbf{O}_1) \times  \left ( \sum_{i=1}^N \mathbf{f}_{i} \right )
=  (\mathbf{O}-\mathbf{O}_1) \times \mathbf{F}
= \mathbf{\Tau}_{O_1}^{\mathbf{F}}$$.

Proving the theorem, i.e. that the sum of torques about $\mathbf{O}_1$ is the same as the torque of the sum of the forces about the same point.
