= Confidence weighting =

Confidence weighting (CW) is concerned with measuring two variables: (1) what a respondent believes is a correct answer to a question and (2) what degree of certainty the respondent has toward the correctness of this belief.

Confidence weighting when applied to a specific answer selection for a particular test or exam question is referred to in the literature from cognitive psychology as item-specific confidence, a term typically used by researchers who investigate metamemory or metacognition, comprehension monitoring, or feeling-of-knowing. Item-specific confidence is defined as calibrating the relationship between an objective performance of accuracy (e.g., a test answer selection) with the subjective measure of confidence, (e.g., a numeric value assigned to the selection). Studies on self-confidence and metacognition during test taking (e.g.,) have used item-specific confidence as a way to assess the accuracy and confidence underlying knowledge judgments.

Researchers outside of the field of cognitive psychology have used confidence weighting as applied to item-specific judgments in assessing alternative conceptions of difficult concepts in high school biology and physics (e.g.,), developing and evaluating computerized adaptive testing (e.g.,), testing computerized assessments of learning and understanding (e.g.,), and developing and testing formative and summative classroom assessments (e.g.,). Confidence weighting is one of three components of the Risk Inclination Model.
