= Midpoint polygon =

Polygon formed from the midpoints of another polygon's edges

In geometry, the midpoint polygon of a polygon P is the polygon whose vertices are the midpoints of the edges of P. It is sometimes called the Kasner polygon after Edward Kasner, who termed it the inscribed polygon "for brevity".

The medial triangle

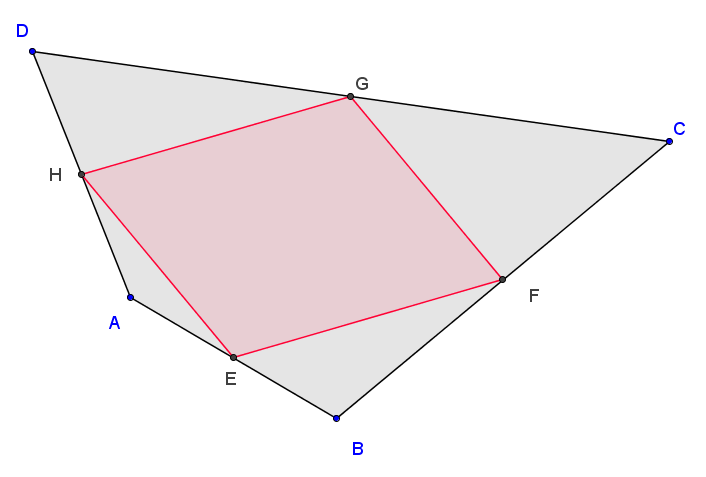
The Varignon parallelogram

== Examples ==
=== Triangle ===
The midpoint polygon of a triangle is called the medial triangle. It shares the same centroid and medians with the original triangle. The perimeter of the medial triangle equals the semiperimeter of the original triangle, and the area is one quarter of the area of the original triangle. This can be proven by the midpoint theorem of triangles and Heron's formula. The orthocenter of the medial triangle coincides with the circumcenter of the original triangle.

=== Quadrilateral ===
The midpoint polygon of a quadrilateral is a parallelogram called its Varignon parallelogram. If the quadrilateral is simple, the area of the parallelogram is one half the area of the original quadrilateral. The perimeter of the parallelogram equals the sum of the diagonals of the original quadrilateral.

== See also ==
- Circulant matrix
- Midpoint-stretching polygon
- Varignon's theorem
