= Orthodiagonal quadrilateral =

Special quadrilateral whose diagonals intersect at right angles

An orthodiagonal quadrilateral (yellow). According to the characterization of these quadrilaterals, the two red squares on two opposite sides of the quadrilateral have the same total area as the two blue squares on the other pair of opposite sides.

In Euclidean geometry, an orthodiagonal quadrilateral is a quadrilateral in which the diagonals cross at right angles. In other words, it is a four-sided figure in which the line segments between non-adjacent vertices are orthogonal (perpendicular) to each other.

== Special cases ==
A kite is an orthodiagonal quadrilateral in which one diagonal is a line of symmetry. The kites are exactly the orthodiagonal quadrilaterals that contain a circle tangent to all four of their sides; that is, the kites are the tangential orthodiagonal quadrilaterals.

A rhombus is an orthodiagonal quadrilateral with two pairs of parallel sides (that is, an orthodiagonal quadrilateral that is also a parallelogram).

A square is a limiting case of both a kite and a rhombus.

Orthodiagonal quadrilaterals that are also equidiagonal quadrilaterals are called midsquare quadrilaterals.

== Characterizations ==
For any orthodiagonal quadrilateral, the sum of the squares of two opposite sides equals that of the other two opposite sides: for successive sides a, b, c, and d, we have

$$\displaystyle a^2+c^2=b^2+d^2.$$

This follows from the Pythagorean theorem, by which either of these two sums of two squares can be expanded to equal the sum of the four squared distances from the quadrilateral's vertices to the point where the diagonals intersect. Conversely, any quadrilateral in which a^{2} + c^{2} = b^{2} + d^{2} must be orthodiagonal. This can be proved in a number of ways, including using the law of cosines, vectors, an indirect proof, and complex numbers.

The diagonals of a convex quadrilateral are perpendicular if and only if the two bimedians have equal length.

According to another characterization, the diagonals of a convex quadrilateral ABCD are perpendicular if and only if

$$\angle PAB + \angle PBA + \angle PCD + \angle PDC = \pi$$

where P is the point of intersection of the diagonals. From this equation it follows almost immediately that the diagonals of a convex quadrilateral are perpendicular if and only if the projections of the diagonal intersection onto the sides of the quadrilateral are the vertices of a cyclic quadrilateral.

An orthodiagonal quadrilateral ABCD (in blue). The Varignon parallelogram (in green) formed by the midpoints of the edges of ABCD is a rectangle. Additionally, the four midpoints (grey) and the four feet of the maltitudes (red) are cocyclic on the 8-point-circle.

A convex quadrilateral is orthodiagonal if and only if its Varignon parallelogram (whose vertices are the midpoints of its sides) is a rectangle. A related characterization states that a convex quadrilateral is orthodiagonal if and only if the midpoints of the sides and the feet of the four maltitudes are eight concyclic points; the eight point circle. The center of this circle is the centroid of the quadrilateral. The quadrilateral formed by the feet of the maltitudes is called the principal orthic quadrilateral.

A second 8-point circle can be constructed from an orthodiagonal quadrilateral ABCD (in blue). The lines perpendicular to each side through the intersection of the diagonals intersect the sides in 8 different points, which are all cocyclic.

If the normals to the sides of a convex quadrilateral ABCD through the diagonal intersection intersect the opposite sides in R, S, T, U, and K, L, M, N are the feet of these normals, then ABCD is orthodiagonal if and only if the eight points K, L, M, N, R, S, T and U are concyclic; the second eight point circle. A related characterization states that a convex quadrilateral is orthodiagonal if and only if RSTU is a rectangle whose sides are parallel to the diagonals of ABCD.

There are several metric characterizations regarding the four triangles formed by the diagonal intersection P and the vertices of a convex quadrilateral ABCD. Denote by m_{1}, m_{2}, m_{3}, m_{4} the medians in triangles ABP, BCP, CDP, DAP from P to the sides AB, BC, CD, DA respectively. If R_{1}, R_{2}, R_{3}, R_{4} and h_{1}, h_{2}, h_{3}, h_{4} denote the radii of the circumcircles and the altitudes respectively of these triangles, then the quadrilateral ABCD is orthodiagonal if and only if any one of the following equalities holds:

- $m_1^2+m_3^2=m_2^2+m_4^2$
- $R_1^2+R_3^2=R_2^2+R_4^2$
- $\frac{1}{h_1^2}+\frac{1}{h_3^2}=\frac{1}{h_2^2}+\frac{1}{h_4^2}$

Furthermore, a quadrilateral ABCD with intersection P of the diagonals is orthodiagonal if and only if the circumcenters of the triangles ABP, BCP, CDP and DAP are the midpoints of the sides of the quadrilateral.

=== Comparison with a tangential quadrilateral ===
A few metric characterizations of tangential quadrilaterals and orthodiagonal quadrilaterals are very similar in appearance, as can be seen in this table. The notations on the sides a, b, c, d, the circumradii R_{1}, R_{2}, R_{3}, R_{4}, and the altitudes h_{1}, h_{2}, h_{3}, h_{4} are the same as above in both types of quadrilaterals.

Tangential quadrilateral	Orthodiagonal quadrilateral
$a+c=b+d$	$a^2+c^2=b^2+d^2$
$R_1+R_3=R_2+R_4$	$R_1^2+R_3^2=R_2^2+R_4^2$
$\frac{1}{h_1}+\frac{1}{h_3}=\frac{1}{h_2}+\frac{1}{h_4}$	$\frac{1}{h_1^2}+\frac{1}{h_3^2}=\frac{1}{h_2^2}+\frac{1}{h_4^2}$

== Area ==
The area K of an orthodiagonal quadrilateral equals one half the product of the lengths of the diagonals p and q:

$$K = \frac{pq}{2}.$$

Conversely, any convex quadrilateral where the area can be calculated with this formula must be orthodiagonal. The orthodiagonal quadrilateral has the biggest area of all convex quadrilaterals with given diagonals.

== Other properties ==
- Orthodiagonal quadrilaterals are the only quadrilaterals for which the sides and the angle formed by the diagonals do not uniquely determine the area. For example, two rhombi both having common side a (and, as for all rhombi, both having a right angle between the diagonals), but one having a smaller acute angle than the other, have different areas (the area of the former approaching zero as the acute angle approaches zero).
- If squares are erected outward on the sides of any quadrilateral (convex, concave, or crossed), then their centres (centroids) are the vertices of an orthodiagonal quadrilateral that is also equidiagonal (that is, having diagonals of equal length). This is called Van Aubel's theorem.
- Each side of an orthodiagonal quadrilateral has at least one common point with the Pascal points circle.

== Properties of orthodiagonal quadrilaterals that are also cyclic ==
=== Circumradius and area ===
For a cyclic orthodiagonal quadrilateral (one that can be inscribed in a circle), suppose the intersection of the diagonals divides one diagonal into segments of lengths p_{1} and p_{2} and divides the other diagonal into segments of lengths q_{1} and q_{2}. Then (the first equality is Proposition 11 in Archimedes' Book of Lemmas)

$$D^2=p_1^2+p_2^2+q_1^2+q_2^2=a^2+c^2=b^2+d^2$$

where D is the diameter of the circumcircle. This holds because the diagonals are perpendicular chords of a circle. These equations yield the circumradius expression

$$R = \tfrac{1}{2}\sqrt{p_1^2+p_2^2+q_1^2+q_2^2}$$

or, in terms of the sides of the quadrilateral, as

$$R = \tfrac{1}{2}\sqrt{a^2+c^2}=\tfrac{1}{2}\sqrt{b^2+d^2}.$$

It also follows that

$$a^2+b^2+c^2+d^2=8R^2.$$

Thus, according to Euler's quadrilateral theorem, the circumradius can be expressed in terms of the diagonals p and q, and the distance x between the midpoints of the diagonals as

$$R = \sqrt{\frac{p^2+q^2+4x^2}{8}}\,.$$

A formula for the area K of a cyclic orthodiagonal quadrilateral in terms of the four sides is obtained directly when combining Ptolemy's theorem and the formula for the area of an orthodiagonal quadrilateral. The result is

$$K=\tfrac{1}{2}(ac+bd).$$

=== Other properties ===
- In a cyclic orthodiagonal quadrilateral, the anticenter coincides with the point where the diagonals intersect.
- Brahmagupta's theorem states that for a cyclic orthodiagonal quadrilateral, the perpendicular from any side through the point of intersection of the diagonals bisects the opposite side.
- If an orthodiagonal quadrilateral is also cyclic, the distance from the circumcenter (the center of the circumscribed circle) to any side equals half the length of the opposite side.
- In a cyclic orthodiagonal quadrilateral, the distance between the midpoints of the diagonals equals the distance between the circumcenter and the point where the diagonals intersect.

== Infinite sets of inscribed rectangles ==
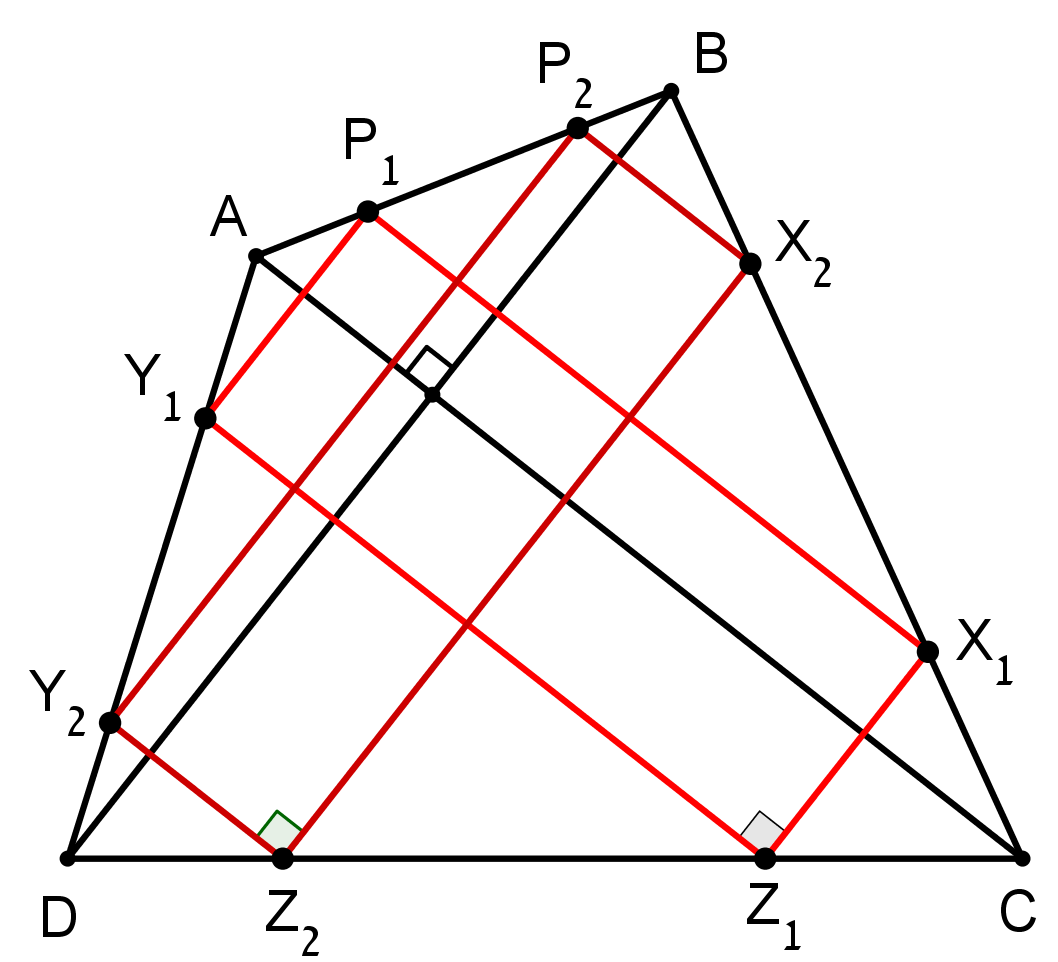
$ABCD$ is an orthodiagonal quadrilateral, $P_{1}X_{1}Z_{1}Y_{1}$ and $P_{2}X_{2}Z_{2}Y_{2}$ are rectangles whose sides are parallel to the diagonals of the quadrilateral.

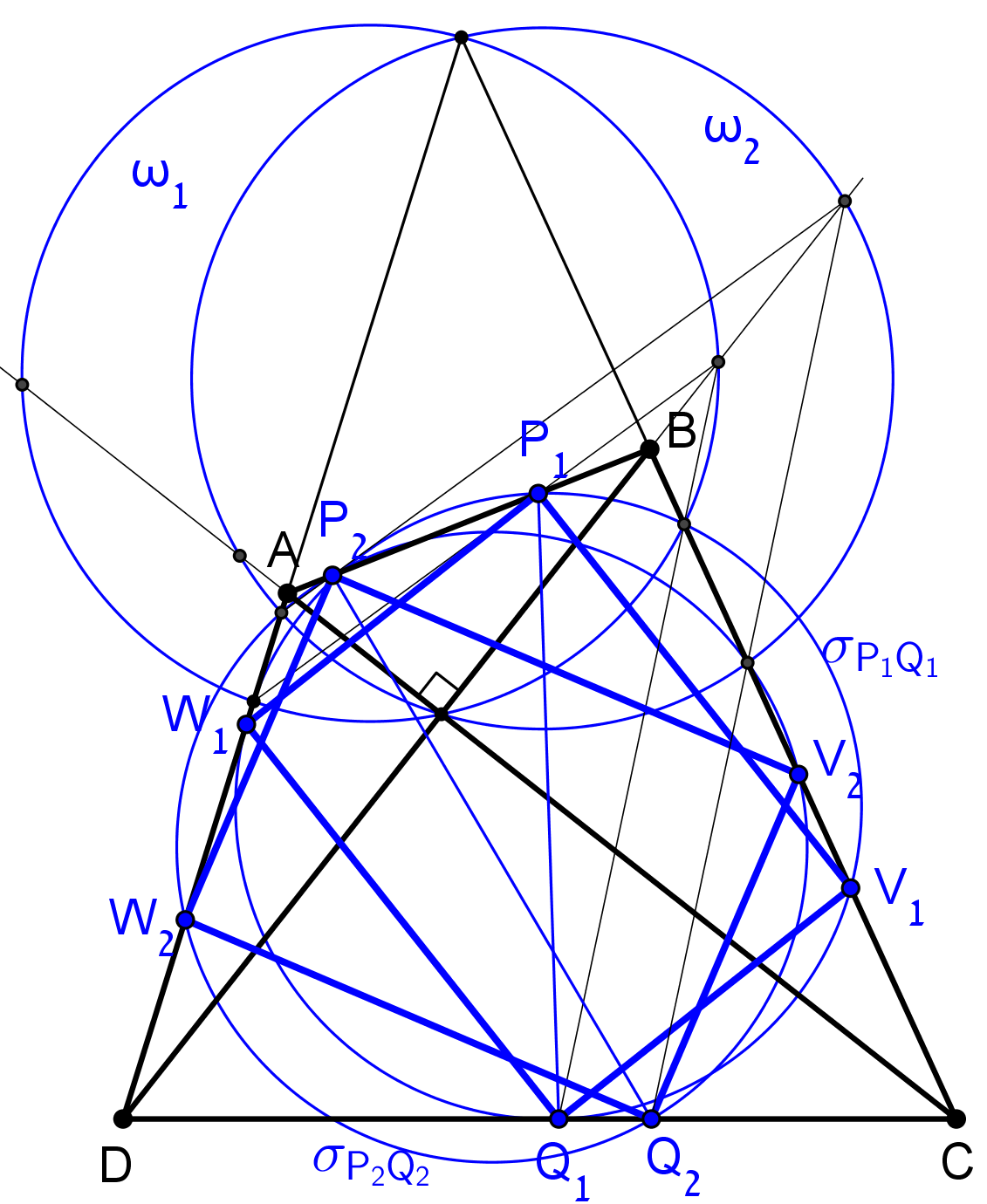
$ABCD$ is an orthodiagonal quadrilateral. $P_{1}$ and $Q_{1}$ are Pascal points formed by the circle $\omega_{1}$, $\sigma_{P_{1}Q_{1}}$ is Pascal-points circle which defines the rectangle $P_{1}V_{1}Q_{1}W_{1}$. $P_{2}$ and $Q_{2}$ are Pascal points formed by the circle $\omega_{2}$, $\sigma_{P_{2}Q_{2}}$ is Pascal-points circle which defines the rectangle $P_{2}V_{2}Q_{2}W_{2}$.

For every orthodiagonal quadrilateral, we can inscribe two infinite sets of rectangles:

(i) a set of rectangles whose sides are parallel to the diagonals of the quadrilateral
(ii) a set of rectangles defined by Pascal-points circles.
