= Midpoint =

Point on a line segment which is equidistant from both endpoints

The midpoint of the segment (x_{1}, y_{1}) to (x_{2}, y_{2})

In geometry, the midpoint is the middle point of a line segment. It is equidistant from both endpoints, and it is the centroid both of the segment and of the endpoints. It bisects the segment.

== Formula ==
The midpoint of a segment in n-dimensional space whose endpoints are $A = (a_1, a_2, \dots , a_n)$ and $B = (b_1, b_2, \dots , b_n)$ is given by

$$\frac{A+B}{2}.$$

That is, the i^{th} coordinate of the midpoint (i = 1, 2, ..., n) is

$$\frac{a_i+b_i} 2.$$

== Construction ==
Given two points of interest, finding the midpoint of the line segment they determine can be accomplished by a compass and straightedge construction. The midpoint of a line segment, embedded in a plane, can be located by first constructing a lens using circular arcs of equal (and large enough) radii centered at the two endpoints, then connecting the cusps of the lens (the two points where the arcs intersect). The point where the line connecting the cusps intersects the segment is then the midpoint of the segment. It is more challenging to locate the midpoint using only a compass, but it is still possible according to the Mohr-Mascheroni theorem.

== Geometric properties involving midpoints ==
=== Circle ===
- The midpoint of any diameter of a circle is the center of the circle.
- Any line perpendicular to any chord of a circle and passing through its midpoint also passes through the circle's center.
- The butterfly theorem states that, if M is the midpoint of a chord PQ of a circle, through which two other chords AB and CD are drawn; AD and BC intersect chord PQ at X and Y correspondingly, then M is the midpoint of XY.

=== Ellipse ===
- The midpoint of any segment which is an area bisector or perimeter bisector of an ellipse is the ellipse's center.
- The ellipse's center is also the midpoint of a segment connecting the two foci of the ellipse.

=== Hyperbola ===
- The midpoint of a segment connecting a hyperbola's vertices is the center of the hyperbola.

=== Triangle ===
- The perpendicular bisector of a side of a triangle is the line that is perpendicular to that side and passes through its midpoint. The three perpendicular bisectors of a triangle's three sides intersect at the circumcenter (the center of the circle through the three vertices).
- The median of a triangle's side passes through both the side's midpoint and the triangle's opposite vertex. The three medians of a triangle intersect at the triangle's centroid (the point on which the triangle would balance if it were made of a thin sheet of uniform-density metal).
- The nine-point center of a triangle lies at the midpoint between the circumcenter and the orthocenter. These points are all on the Euler line.
- A midsegment (or midline) of a triangle is a line segment that joins the midpoints of two sides of the triangle. It is parallel to the third side and has a length equal to one half of that third side.
- The medial triangle of a given triangle has vertices at the midpoints of the given triangle's sides, therefore its sides are the three midsegments of the given triangle. It shares the same centroid and medians with the given triangle. The perimeter of the medial triangle equals the semiperimeter (half the perimeter) of the original triangle, and its area is one quarter of the area of the original triangle. The orthocenter (intersection of the altitudes) of the medial triangle coincides with the circumcenter (center of the circle through the vertices) of the original triangle.
- Every triangle has an inscribed ellipse, called its Steiner inellipse, that is internally tangent to the triangle at the midpoints of all its sides. This ellipse is centered at the triangle's centroid, and it has the largest area of any ellipse inscribed in the triangle.
- In a right triangle, the circumcenter is the midpoint of the hypotenuse.
- In an isosceles triangle, the median, altitude, and perpendicular bisector from the base side and the angle bisector of the apex coincide with the Euler line and the axis of symmetry, and these coinciding lines go through the midpoint of the base side.

=== Quadrilateral ===
- The two bimedians of a convex quadrilateral are the line segments that connect the midpoints of opposite sides, hence each bisecting two sides. The two bimedians and the line segment joining the midpoints of the diagonals are concurrent at (all intersect at)a point called the "vertex centroid", which is the midpoint of all three of these segments.
- The four "maltitudes" of a convex quadrilateral are the perpendiculars to a side through the midpoint of the opposite side, hence bisecting the latter side. If the quadrilateral is cyclic (inscribed in a circle), these maltitudes all meet at a common point called the "anticenter".
- Brahmagupta's theorem states that if a cyclic quadrilateral is orthodiagonal (that is, has perpendicular diagonals), then the perpendicular to a side from the point of intersection of the diagonals always goes through the midpoint of the opposite side.
- Varignon's theorem states that the midpoints of the sides of an arbitrary quadrilateral form the vertices of a parallelogram, and if the quadrilateral is not self-intersecting then the area of the parallelogram is half the area of the quadrilateral.
- The Newton line is the line that connects the midpoints of the two diagonals in a convex quadrilateral that is not a parallelogram. The line segments connecting the midpoints of opposite sides of a convex quadrilateral intersect in a point that lies on the Newton line.

=== General polygons ===
- A regular polygon has an inscribed circle which is tangent to each side of the polygon at its midpoint.
- In a regular polygon with an even number of sides, the midpoint of a diagonal between opposite vertices is the polygon's center.
- The midpoint-stretching polygon of a cyclic polygon P (a polygon whose vertices all fall on the same circle) is another cyclic polygon inscribed in the same circle, the polygon whose vertices are the midpoints of the circular arcs between the vertices of P. Iterating the midpoint-stretching operation on an arbitrary initial polygon results in a sequence of polygons whose shapes converge to that of a regular polygon.

== Generalizations ==
The abovementioned formulas for the midpoint of a segment implicitly use the lengths of segments. However, in the generalization to affine geometry, where segment lengths are not defined, the midpoint can still be defined since it is an affine invariant. The synthetic affine definition of the midpoint M of a segment AB is the projective harmonic conjugate of the point at infinity, P, of the line AB. That is, the point M such that H[A,B; P,M]. When coordinates can be introduced in an affine geometry, the two definitions of midpoint will coincide.

The midpoint is not naturally defined in projective geometry since there is no distinguished point to play the role of the point at infinity (any point in a projective range may be projectively mapped to any other point in (the same or some other) projective range). However, fixing a point at infinity defines an affine structure on the projective line in question and the above definition can be applied.

The definition of the midpoint of a segment may be extended to curve segments, such as geodesic arcs on a Riemannian manifold. Note that, unlike in the affine case, the midpoint between two points may not be uniquely determined.

== See also ==
- Center (geometry) § Projective conics
- Midpoint polygon
- Bisection § Line segment bisector
- Numerical integration § Quadrature rules based on interpolating functions
