= Parallelogram =

Quadrilateral with two pairs of parallel sides

- This parallelogram is a rhomboid as it has unequal sides and no right angles.
- Type: Quadrilateral, Trapezium
- Edges and vertices: 4
- Symmetry group: C_{2}, [2]^{+},
- Area: bh (base × height); ab sin θ (product of adjacent sides and sine of the vertex angle determined by them)
- Properties: Convex polygon

In Euclidean geometry, a parallelogram is a chiral simple (non-self-intersecting) quadrilateral with two pairs of parallel sides. The opposite or facing sides of a parallelogram are of equal length and the opposite angles of a parallelogram are of equal measure. The congruence of opposite sides and opposite angles is a direct consequence of the Euclidean parallel postulate and neither condition can be proven without appealing to the Euclidean parallel postulate or one of its equivalent formulations.

By comparison, a quadrilateral with at least one pair of parallel sides is a trapezoid in American English or a trapezium in British English.

The three-dimensional counterpart of a parallelogram is a parallelepiped.

The word "parallelogram" comes from the Greek παραλληλό-γραμμον, parallēló-grammon, which means "a shape of parallel lines".

== Special cases ==
- Rectangle – A parallelogram with four right angles.
- Rhombus – A parallelogram with four sides of equal length.
- Square – A parallelogram with four sides of equal length and four right angles.
- Rhomboid – A parallelogram with adjacent sides that are of unequal lengths and non-right angles (and thus is neither a rectangle nor a rhombus). This term is not used in modern mathematics but it does survive in some contexts in biology in names like the rhomboid muscles or rhomboid leaf shapes.

== Characterizations ==
A simple (non-self-intersecting) quadrilateral is a parallelogram if and only if any one of the following statements is true:

- Two pairs of opposite sides are parallel (by definition).
- Two pairs of opposite sides are equal in length.
- Two pairs of opposite angles are equal in measure.
- The diagonals bisect each other.
- One pair of opposite sides is parallel and equal in length.
- Adjacent angles are supplementary.
- Each diagonal divides the quadrilateral into two congruent triangles.
- The sum of the squares of the sides equals the sum of the squares of the diagonals. (This is the parallelogram law.)
- It has rotational symmetry of order 2.
- The sum of the distances from any interior point to the sides is independent of the location of the point. (This is an extension of Viviani's theorem.)
- There is a point X in the plane of the quadrilateral with the property that every straight line through X divides the quadrilateral into two regions of equal area.

Thus, all parallelograms have all the properties listed above, and conversely, if just any one of these statements is true in a simple quadrilateral, then it is considered a parallelogram.

== Other properties ==
- Opposite sides of a parallelogram are parallel (by definition) and so will never intersect.
- The area of a parallelogram is twice the area of a triangle created by one of its diagonals.
- The area of a parallelogram is also equal to the magnitude of the vector cross product of two adjacent sides.
- Any line through the midpoint of a parallelogram bisects the area.
- Any non-degenerate affine transformation takes a parallelogram to another parallelogram.
- A parallelogram has rotational symmetry of order 2 (through 180°) (or order 4 if a square). If it also has exactly two lines of reflectional symmetry then it must be a rhombus or an oblong (a non-square rectangle). If it has four lines of reflectional symmetry, it is a square.
- The perimeter of a parallelogram is 2(a + b) where a and b are the lengths of adjacent sides.
- Unlike any other convex polygon, a parallelogram cannot be inscribed in any triangle with less than twice its area.
- The centers of four squares all constructed either internally or externally on the sides of a parallelogram are the vertices of a square.
- If two lines parallel to sides of a parallelogram are constructed concurrent to a diagonal, then the parallelograms formed on opposite sides of that diagonal are equal in area.
- The diagonals of a parallelogram divide it into four triangles of equal area.

== Area formula ==
A parallelogram can be rearranged into a rectangle with the same area.

Animation for the area formula $K = bh$.

All of the area formulas for general convex quadrilaterals apply to parallelograms. Further formulas are specific to parallelograms:

A parallelogram with base b and height h can be divided into a trapezoid and a right triangle, and rearranged into a rectangle, as shown in the figure to the left. This means that the area of a parallelogram is the same as that of a rectangle with the same base and height:

$$K = bh.$$

The area of the parallelogram is the area of the blue region, which is the interior of the parallelogram

The base × height area formula can also be derived using the figure to the right. The area K of the parallelogram to the right (the blue area) is the total area of the rectangle less the area of the two orange triangles. The area of the rectangle is
$$K_\text{rect} = (B+A) \times H\,$$
and the area of a single triangle is
$$K_\text{tri} = \frac{A}{2} \times H. \,$$
Therefore, the area of the parallelogram is
$$K = K_\text{rect} - 2 \times K_\text{tri} = ( (B+A) \times H) - ( A \times H) = B \times H.$$

Another area formula, for two sides B and C and angle θ, is
$$K = B \cdot C \cdot \sin \theta.\,$$

Provided that the parallelogram is a rhombus, the area can be expressed using sides B and C and angle $\gamma$ at the intersection of the diagonals:

$$K = \frac{|\tan \gamma|}{2} \cdot \left| B^2 - C^2 \right|.$$

When the parallelogram is specified from the lengths B and C of two adjacent sides together with the length D_{1} of either diagonal, then the area can be found from Heron's formula. Specifically it is
$$K=2\sqrt{S(S-B)(S-C)(S-D_1)}=\frac{1}{2}\sqrt{(B+C+D_1)(-B+C+D_1)(B-C+D_1)(B+C-D_1)},$$
where $S=(B+C+D_1)/2$ and the leading factor 2 comes from the fact that the chosen diagonal divides the parallelogram into two congruent triangles.

=== From vertex coordinates ===
Let vectors $\mathbf{a},\mathbf{b}\in\R^2$ and let
$$V = \begin{bmatrix} a_1 & a_2 \\ b_1 & b_2 \end{bmatrix} \in\R^{2 \times 2}$$
denote the matrix with elements of a and b. Then the area of the parallelogram generated by a and b is equal to $|\det(V)| = |a_1b_2 - a_2b_1|\,$.

Let vectors $\mathbf{a},\mathbf{b}\in\R^n$ and let
$$V = \begin{bmatrix} a_1 & a_2 & \dots & a_n \\ b_1 & b_2 & \dots & b_n \end{bmatrix} \in\R^{2 \times n}$$
. Then the area of the parallelogram generated by a and b is equal to $\sqrt{\det(V V^\mathrm{T})}$.

Let points $a,b,c\in\R^2$. Then the signed area of the parallelogram with vertices at a, b and c is equivalent to the determinant of a matrix built using a, b and c as rows with the last column padded using ones as follows:
$$K = \left| \begin{matrix}
a_1 & a_2 & 1 \\
b_1 & b_2 & 1 \\
c_1 & c_2 & 1
\end{matrix} \right|.$$

== Proof that diagonals bisect each other ==
Parallelogram ABCD

To prove that the diagonals of a parallelogram bisect each other, we will use congruent triangles:

$\angle ABE \cong \angle CDE$ (alternate interior angles are equal in measure)
$\angle BAE \cong \angle DCE$ (alternate interior angles are equal in measure).

(since these are angles that a transversal makes with parallel lines AB and DC).

Also, side AB is equal in length to side DC, since opposite sides of a parallelogram are equal in length.

Therefore, triangles ABE and CDE are congruent (ASA postulate, two corresponding angles and the included side).

Therefore,

$$AE = CE$$
$$BE = DE.$$

Since the diagonals AC and BD divide each other into segments of equal length, the diagonals bisect each other.

Separately, since the diagonals AC and BD bisect each other at point E, point E is the midpoint of each diagonal.

== Lattice of parallelograms ==
Parallelograms can tile the plane by translation. If edges are equal, or angles are right, the symmetry of the lattice is higher. These represent the four Bravais lattices in 2 dimensions.

Lattices
Form	Square	Rectangle	Rhombus	Rhomboid
System	Square (tetragonal)	Rectangular (orthorhombic)	Centered rectangular (orthorhombic)	Oblique (monoclinic)
Constraints	α=90°, a=b	α=90°	a=b	None
Symmetry	p4m, [4,4], order 8n	pmm, [∞,2,∞], order 4n		p1, [∞^{+},2,∞^{+}], order 2n
Form				

== Parallelograms arising from other figures ==
=== Automedian triangle ===
An automedian triangle is one whose medians are in the same proportions as its sides (though in a different order). If ABC is an automedian triangle in which vertex A stands opposite the side a, G is the centroid (where the three medians of ABC intersect), and AL is one of the extended medians of ABC with L lying on the circumcircle of ABC, then BGCL is a parallelogram.

=== Varignon parallelogram ===
Proof without words of Varignon's theorem

Varignon's theorem holds that the midpoints of the sides of an arbitrary quadrilateral are the vertices of a parallelogram, called its Varignon parallelogram. If the quadrilateral is convex or concave (that is, not self-intersecting), then the area of the Varignon parallelogram is half the area of the quadrilateral.

Proof without words (see figure):

1. An arbitrary quadrilateral and its diagonals.
2. Bases of similar triangles are parallel to the blue diagonal.
3. Ditto for the red diagonal.
4. The base pairs form a parallelogram with half the area of the quadrilateral, A_{q}, as the sum of the areas of the four large triangles, A_{l} is 2 A_{q} (each of the two pairs reconstructs the quadrilateral) while that of the small triangles, A_{s} is a quarter of A_{l} (half linear dimensions yields quarter area), and the area of the parallelogram is A_{q} minus A_{s}.

=== Tangent parallelogram of an ellipse ===
For an ellipse, two diameters are said to be conjugate if and only if the tangent line to the ellipse at an endpoint of one diameter is parallel to the other diameter. Each pair of conjugate diameters of an ellipse has a corresponding tangent parallelogram, sometimes called a bounding parallelogram, formed by the tangent lines to the ellipse at the four endpoints of the conjugate diameters. All tangent parallelograms for a given ellipse have the same area.

It is possible to reconstruct an ellipse from any pair of conjugate diameters, or from any tangent parallelogram.

=== Faces of a parallelepiped ===
A parallelepiped is a three-dimensional figure whose six faces are parallelograms.

== See also ==
- parallelogon, generalisation encompassing hexagons as well as quadrilaterals
- zonogon, generalisation to polygons with any even number of sides
- Antiparallelogram
- Levi-Civita parallelogramoid
