= Varignon's theorem =

Theorem in geometry

Area(EFGH) = (1/2)Area(ABCD)

In Euclidean geometry, Varignon's theorem holds that the midpoints of the sides of an arbitrary quadrilateral form a parallelogram, called the Varignon parallelogram. It is named after Pierre Varignon, whose proof was published posthumously in 1731.

== Theorem ==
The midpoints of the sides of an arbitrary quadrilateral form a parallelogram. If the quadrilateral is convex or concave (not complex), then the area of the parallelogram is half the area of the quadrilateral.

If one introduces the concept of oriented areas for n-gons, then this area equality also holds for complex quadrilaterals.

The Varignon parallelogram exists even for a skew quadrilateral, and is planar whether the quadrilateral is planar or not. The theorem can be generalized to the midpoint polygon of an arbitrary polygon.

== Proof ==
Referring to the diagram above, triangles ADC and HDG are similar by the side-angle-side criterion, so angles DAC and DHG are equal, making HG parallel to AC. In the same way EF is parallel to AC, so HG and EF are parallel to each other; the same holds for HE and GF.

Varignon's theorem can also be proved as a theorem of affine geometry organized as linear algebra with the linear combinations restricted to coefficients summing to 1, also called affine or barycentric coordinates. The proof applies even to skew quadrilaterals in spaces of any dimension.

Any three points E, F, G are completed to a parallelogram (lying in the plane containing E, F, and G) by taking its fourth vertex to be E − F + G. In the construction of the Varignon parallelogram this is the point (A + B)/2 − (B + C)/2 + (C + D)/2 = (A + D)/2. But this is the point H in the figure, whence EFGH forms a parallelogram.

In short, the centroid of the four points A, B, C, D is the midpoint of each of the two diagonals EG and FH of EFGH, showing that the midpoints coincide.

From the first proof, one can see that the sum of the diagonals is equal to the perimeter of the parallelogram formed. Also, we can use vectors 1/2 the length of each side to first determine the area of the quadrilateral, and then to find areas of the four triangles divided by each side of the inner parallelogram.

convex quadrilateral	concave quadrilateral	crossed quadrilateral

Proof without words of Varignon's theorem: 1. An arbitrary quadrilateral and its diagonals.; 2. Bases of similar triangles are parallel to the blue diagonal.; 3. Ditto for the red diagonal.; 4. The base pairs form a parallelogram with half the area of the quadrilateral, A_{q}, as the sum of the areas of the four large triangles, A_{l}, is 2 A_{q} (each of the two pairs reconstructs the quadrilateral) while that of the small triangles, A_{s} is a quarter of A_{l} (half linear dimensions yields quarter area), and the area of the parallelogram is A_{q} minus A_{s}.

== The Varignon parallelogram ==
=== Properties ===
A planar Varignon parallelogram also has the following properties:

- Each pair of opposite sides of the Varignon parallelogram are parallel to a diagonal in the original quadrilateral.
- A side of the Varignon parallelogram is half as long as the diagonal in the original quadrilateral it is parallel to.
- The area of the Varignon parallelogram equals half the area of the original quadrilateral. This is true in convex, concave and crossed quadrilaterals provided the area of the latter is defined to be the difference of the areas of the two triangles it is composed of.
- The perimeter of the Varignon parallelogram equals the sum of the diagonals of the original quadrilateral.
- The diagonals of the Varignon parallelogram are the bimedians of the original quadrilateral.
- The two bimedians in a quadrilateral and the line segment joining the midpoints of the diagonals in that quadrilateral are concurrent and are all bisected by their point of intersection.

In a convex quadrilateral with sides a, b, c and d, the length of the bimedian that connects the midpoints of the sides a and c is

$$m=\tfrac{1}{2}\sqrt{-a^2+b^2-c^2+d^2+p^2+q^2}$$

where p and q are the length of the diagonals. The length of the bimedian that connects the midpoints of the sides b and d is

$$n=\tfrac{1}{2}\sqrt{a^2-b^2+c^2-d^2+p^2+q^2}.$$

Hence

$$\displaystyle p^2+q^2=2(m^2+n^2).$$

This is also a corollary to the parallelogram law applied in the Varignon parallelogram.

The lengths of the bimedians can also be expressed in terms of two opposite sides and the distance x between the midpoints of the diagonals. This is possible when using Euler's quadrilateral theorem in the above formulas. Whence

$$m=\tfrac{1}{2}\sqrt{2(b^2+d^2)-4x^2}$$

and

$$n=\tfrac{1}{2}\sqrt{2(a^2+c^2)-4x^2}.$$

The two opposite sides in these formulas are not the two that the bimedian connects.

In a convex quadrilateral, there is the following dual connection between the bimedians and the diagonals:

- The two bimedians have equal length if and only if the two diagonals are perpendicular.
- The two bimedians are perpendicular if and only if the two diagonals have equal length.

=== Special cases ===
The Varignon parallelogram is a rhombus if and only if the two diagonals of the quadrilateral have equal length, that is, if the quadrilateral is an equidiagonal quadrilateral.

The Varignon parallelogram is a rectangle if and only if the diagonals of the quadrilateral are perpendicular, that is, if the quadrilateral is an orthodiagonal quadrilateral.

For a self-crossing quadrilateral, the Varignon parallelogram can degenerate to four collinear points, forming a line segment traversed twice. This happens whenever the polygon is formed by replacing two parallel sides of a trapezoid by the two diagonals of the trapezoid, such as in the antiparallelogram.

== See also ==
- Perpendicular bisector construction of a quadrilateral, a different way of forming another quadrilateral from a given quadrilateral
- Morley's trisector theorem, a related theorem on triangles

== References and further reading ==
- H. S. M. Coxeter, S. L. Greitzer: Geometry Revisited. MAA, Washington 1967, pp. 52-54
- Peter N. Oliver: Consequences of Varignon Parallelogram Theorem. Mathematics Teacher, Band 94, Nr. 5, Mai 2001, pp. 406-408
