= Concave polygon =

Simple polygon which is not convex

An example of a concave polygon.

A simple polygon that is not convex is called concave, non-convex or reentrant. A concave polygon will always have at least one reflex interior angle—that is, an angle with a measure that is between 180° degrees and 360° degrees exclusive.

== Polygon ==
Some lines containing interior points of a concave polygon intersect its boundary at more than two points. Some diagonals of a concave polygon lie partly or wholly outside the polygon. Some sidelines of a concave polygon fail to divide the plane into two half-planes one of which entirely contains the polygon. None of these three statements holds for a convex polygon.

As with any simple polygon, the sum of the internal angles of a concave polygon is π(n − 2) radians, equivalently 180°(n − 2) degrees, where n is the number of sides.

It is always possible to partition a concave polygon into a set of convex polygons. A polynomial-time algorithm for finding a decomposition into as few convex polygons as possible is described by Chazelle & Dobkin (1985).

According to Euclidean geometry, a triangle can never be concave, but there exist concave polygons with n sides for any n > 3. An example of a concave quadrilateral is the dart.

At least one interior angle does not contain all other vertices in its edges and interior.

The convex hull of the concave polygon's vertices, and that of its edges, contains points that are exterior to the polygon.
