= Quadrilateral =

Four-sided polygon

- Some types of quadrilaterals
- Edges and vertices: 4
- Schläfli symbol: {4} (for square)
- Area: various methods; see below
- Internal angle (degrees): 90° (for square and rectangle)

In geometry, a quadrilateral is a four-sided polygon, having four edges (sides) and four corners (vertices). The word is derived from the Latin words quadri, a variant of four, and latus, meaning "side". It is also called a tetragon, derived from Greek "tetra" meaning "four" and "gon" meaning "corner" or "angle", in analogy to other polygons (e.g. pentagon). Since "gon" means "angle", it is analogously called a quadrangle, or 4-angle. A quadrilateral with vertices $A$, $B$, $C$ and $D$ is sometimes denoted as $\square ABCD$.

Quadrilaterals are either simple (not self-intersecting), or complex (self-intersecting, or crossed). Simple quadrilaterals are either convex or concave.

The interior angles of a simple (and planar) quadrilateral ABCD add up to 360 degrees, that is

$$\angle A+\angle B+\angle C+\angle D=360^{\circ}.$$

This is a special case of the n-gon interior angle sum formula: S = (n − 2) × 180° (here, n=4).

All non-self-crossing quadrilaterals tile the plane, by repeated rotation around the midpoints of their edges.

== Simple quadrilaterals ==
Any quadrilateral that is not self-intersecting is a simple quadrilateral.

=== Convex quadrilateral ===
Euler diagram of some types of simple quadrilaterals. (UK) denotes British English and (US) denotes American English.

Convex quadrilaterals by symmetry, represented with a Hasse diagram

In a convex quadrilateral all interior angles are less than 180°, and the two diagonals both lie inside the quadrilateral.

- Irregular quadrilateral (Note: Sometimes called a trapezoid (UK) or trapezium (US); see Trapezoid § Etymology): no sides are parallel.
- Trapezium (UK) or trapezoid (US): at least one pair of opposite sides are parallel. Trapezia (UK) and trapezoids (US) include parallelograms.
- Isosceles trapezium (UK) or isosceles trapezoid (US): one pair of opposite sides are parallel and the base angles are equal in measure. Alternative definitions are a quadrilateral with an axis of symmetry bisecting one pair of opposite sides, or a trapezoid with diagonals of equal length.
- Parallelogram: a quadrilateral with two pairs of parallel sides. Equivalent conditions are that opposite sides are of equal length; that opposite angles are equal; or that the diagonals bisect each other. Parallelograms include rhombi (including those rectangles called squares) and rhomboids (including those rectangles called oblongs). In other words, parallelograms include all rhombi and all rhomboids, and thus also include all rectangles.
- Rhombus, rhomb: all four sides are of equal length (equilateral). An equivalent condition is that the diagonals perpendicularly bisect each other. Informally: "a pushed-over square" (but strictly including a square, too).
- Rhomboid: a parallelogram in which adjacent sides are of unequal lengths, and some angles are oblique (equiv., having no right angles). Informally: "a pushed-over oblong". Not all references agree; some define a rhomboid as a parallelogram that is not a rhombus.
- Rectangle: all four angles are right angles (equiangular). An equivalent condition is that the diagonals bisect each other, and are equal in length. Rectangles include squares and oblongs. Informally: "a box or oblong" (including a square).
- Square (regular quadrilateral): all four sides are of equal length (equilateral), and all four angles are right angles. An equivalent condition is that opposite sides are parallel (a square is a parallelogram), and that the diagonals perpendicularly bisect each other and are of equal length. A quadrilateral is a square if and only if it is both a rhombus and a rectangle (i.e., four equal sides and four equal angles).
- Oblong: longer than wide, or wider than long (i.e., a rectangle that is not a square).
- Kite: two pairs of adjacent sides are of equal length. This implies that one diagonal divides the kite into congruent triangles, and so the angles between the two pairs of equal sides are equal in measure. It also implies that the diagonals are perpendicular. Kites include rhombi. It is a type of tangential quadrilateral.

- Tangential quadrilateral: the four sides are tangents to an inscribed circle. A convex quadrilateral is tangential if and only if opposite sides have equal sums.
- Tangential trapezoid: a trapezoid where the four sides are tangents to an inscribed circle.
- Cyclic quadrilateral: the four vertices lie on a circumscribed circle. A convex quadrilateral is cyclic if and only if opposite angles sum to 180°.
- Right kite: a kite with two opposite right angles. It is a cyclic kite, and thus a type of bicentric quadrilateral.
- Harmonic quadrilateral: a cyclic quadrilateral such that the products of the lengths of the opposing sides are equal.
- Bicentric quadrilateral: it is both tangential and cyclic.
- Orthodiagonal quadrilateral: the diagonals cross at right angles.
- Equidiagonal quadrilateral: the diagonals are of equal length.
- Bisect-diagonal quadrilateral: one diagonal bisects the other into equal lengths. Every dart and kite is bisect-diagonal. When both diagonals bisect another, it's a parallelogram.
- Ex-tangential quadrilateral: the four extensions of the sides are tangent to an excircle.
- An equilic quadrilateral has two opposite equal sides that when extended, meet at 60°.
- A Watt quadrilateral is a quadrilateral with a pair of opposite sides of equal length.
- A quadric quadrilateral is a convex quadrilateral whose four vertices all lie on the perimeter of a square.
- A diametric quadrilateral is a cyclic quadrilateral having one of its sides as a diameter of the circumcircle.
- A Hjelmslev quadrilateral is a quadrilateral with two right angles at opposite vertices.

=== Concave quadrilaterals ===
In a concave quadrilateral, one interior angle is bigger than 180°, and one of the two diagonals lies outside the quadrilateral.

- A dart (or arrowhead) is a concave quadrilateral with bilateral symmetry like a kite, but where one interior angle is reflex. See Kite.

== Complex quadrilaterals ==
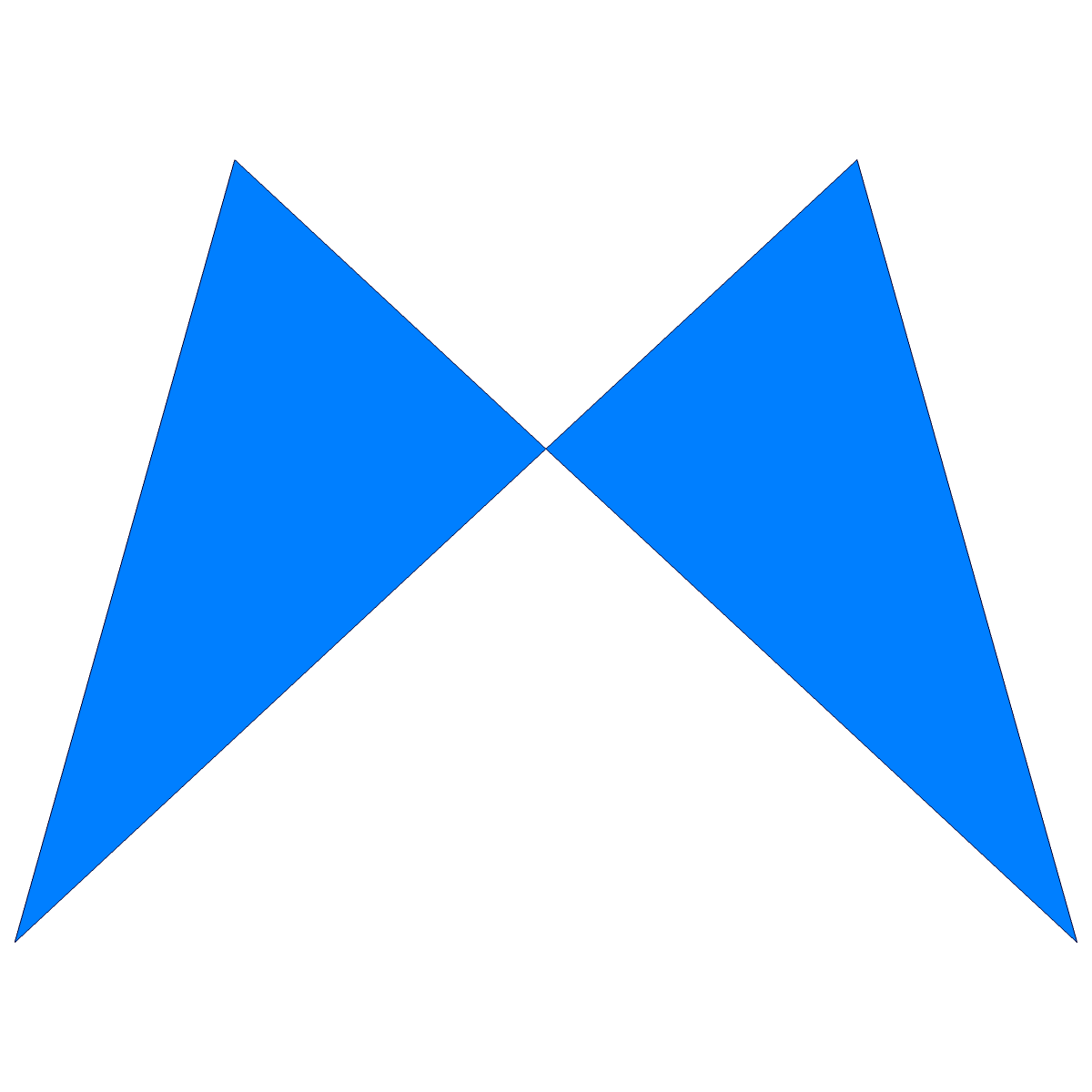
An antiparallelogram

A self-intersecting quadrilateral is called variously a cross-quadrilateral, crossed quadrilateral, butterfly quadrilateral or bow-tie quadrilateral. In a crossed quadrilateral, the four "interior" angles on either side of the crossing (two acute and two reflex, all on the left or all on the right as the figure is traced out) add up to 720°.

- Crossed trapezoid (US) or trapezium (Commonwealth): a crossed quadrilateral in which one pair of nonadjacent sides is parallel (like a trapezoid).
- Antiparallelogram: a crossed quadrilateral in which each pair of nonadjacent sides have equal lengths (like a parallelogram).
- Crossed rectangle: an antiparallelogram whose sides are two opposite sides and the two diagonals of a rectangle, hence having one pair of parallel opposite sides.
- Crossed square: a special case of a crossed rectangle where two of the sides intersect at right angles.

== Special line segments ==
The two diagonals of a convex quadrilateral are the line segments that connect opposite vertices.

The two bimedians of a convex quadrilateral are the line segments that connect the midpoints of opposite sides. They intersect at the "vertex centroid" of the quadrilateral (see § Remarkable points and lines in a convex quadrilateral below).

The four maltitudes of a convex quadrilateral are the perpendiculars to a side—through the midpoint of the opposite side.

== Area of a convex quadrilateral ==
There are various general formulas for the area K of a convex quadrilateral ABCD with sides a = AB, b = BC, c = CD and d = DA.

=== Trigonometric formulas ===
The area can be expressed in trigonometric terms as

$$K = \tfrac12 pq \sin \theta,$$

where the lengths of the diagonals are p and q and the angle between them is θ. In the case of an orthodiagonal quadrilateral (e.g. rhombus, square, and kite), this formula reduces to $K=\tfrac{pq}{2}$ since θ is 90°.

The area can be also expressed in terms of bimedians as

$$K = mn \sin \varphi,$$

where the lengths of the bimedians are m and n and the angle between them is φ.

Bretschneider's formula expresses the area in terms of the sides and two opposite angles:

$$\begin{align}
K &= \sqrt{(s-a)(s-b)(s-c)(s-d) - \tfrac{1}{2} abcd \; [ 1 + \cos (A + C) ]} \\
&= \sqrt{(s-a)(s-b)(s-c)(s-d) - abcd\, \cos^2 \tfrac12(A + C) }
\end{align}$$

where the sides in sequence are a, b, c, d, where s is the semiperimeter, and A and C are two (in fact, any two) opposite angles. This reduces to Brahmagupta's formula for the area of a cyclic quadrilateral—when A + C = 180° .

Another area formula in terms of the sides and angles, with angle C being between sides b and c, and A being between sides a and d, is

$$K = \tfrac12 ad \sin{A} + \tfrac12 bc \sin{C}.$$

In the case of a cyclic quadrilateral, the latter formula becomes $K = \tfrac12(ad+bc)\sin{A}.$

In a parallelogram, where both pairs of opposite sides and angles are equal, this formula reduces to $K=ab \cdot \sin{A}.$

Alternatively, we can write the area in terms of the sides and the intersection angle θ of the diagonals, as long as θ is not 90°:

$$K = \tfrac14 \left|\tan \theta\right| \cdot \left| a^2 + c^2 - b^2 - d^2 \right|.$$

In the case of a parallelogram, the latter formula becomes $K = \tfrac12 \left|\tan \theta\right| \cdot \left| a^2 - b^2 \right|.$

Another area formula including the sides a, b, c, d is

$$K=\tfrac12 \sqrt{\bigl((a^2+c^2)-2x^2\bigr)\bigl((b^2+d^2)-2x^2\bigr)} \sin{\varphi}$$

where x is the distance between the midpoints of the diagonals, and φ is the angle between the bimedians.

The last trigonometric area formula including the sides a, b, c, d and the angle α (between a and b) is:

$$K=\tfrac12 ab \sin{\alpha}+\tfrac14 \sqrt{4c^2d^2-(c^2+d^2-a^2-b^2+2ab \cos{\alpha})^2} ,$$

which can also be used for the area of a concave quadrilateral (having the concave part opposite to angle α), by just changing the first sign + to -.

=== Non-trigonometric formulas ===
The following two formulas express the area in terms of the sides a, b, c and d, the semiperimeter s, and the diagonals p, q:

$K = \sqrt{(s-a)(s-b)(s-c)(s-d) - \tfrac{1}{4}(ac+bd+pq)(ac+bd-pq)},$

$K = \tfrac14 \sqrt{4p^2q^2 - \left( a^2 + c^2 - b^2 - d^2 \right)^2}.$

The first reduces to Brahmagupta's formula in the cyclic quadrilateral case, since then pq = ac + bd.

The area can also be expressed in terms of the bimedians m, n and the diagonals p, q:

$K=\tfrac12 \sqrt{(m+n+p)(m+n-p)(m+n+q)(m+n-q)},$

$K=\tfrac12 \sqrt{p^2q^2-(m^2-n^2)^2}.$

In fact, any three of the four values m, n, p, and q suffice for determination of the area, since in any quadrilateral the four values are related by $p^2+q^2=2(m^2+n^2).$ The corresponding expressions are:

$$K=\tfrac12 \sqrt{[(m+n)^2-p^2]\cdot[p^2-(m-n)^2]},$$

if the lengths of two bimedians and one diagonal are given, and

$$K=\tfrac14 \sqrt{[(p+q)^2-4m^2]\cdot[4m^2-(p-q)^2]},$$

if the lengths of two diagonals and one bimedian are given.

=== Vector formulas ===
The area of a quadrilateral ABCD can be calculated using vectors. Let vectors AC and BD form the diagonals from A to C and from B to D. The area of the quadrilateral is then

$$K = \tfrac12 |\mathbf{AC}\times\mathbf{BD}|,$$

which is half the magnitude of the cross product of vectors AC and BD. In two-dimensional Euclidean space, expressing vector AC as a free vector in Cartesian space equal to (x_{1},y_{1}) and BD as (x_{2},y_{2}), this can be rewritten as:

$$K = \tfrac12 |x_1 y_2 - x_2 y_1|.$$

== Diagonals ==
=== Properties of the diagonals in quadrilaterals ===
In the following table it is listed if the diagonals in some of the most basic quadrilaterals bisect each other, if their diagonals are perpendicular, and if their diagonals have equal length. The list applies to the most general cases, and excludes named subsets.

Quadrilateral	Bisecting diagonals	Perpendicular diagonals	Equal diagonals
Trapezoid	No	See note 1	No
Isosceles trapezoid	No	See note 1	Yes
Parallelogram	Yes	No	No
Kite	See note 2	Yes	See note 2
Rectangle	Yes	No	Yes
Rhombus	Yes	Yes	No
Square	Yes	Yes	Yes

- Note 1: The most general trapezoids and isosceles trapezoids do not have perpendicular diagonals, but there are infinite numbers of (non-similar) trapezoids and isosceles trapezoids that do have perpendicular diagonals and are not any other named quadrilateral.
- Note 2: In a kite, one diagonal bisects the other. The most general kite has unequal diagonals, but there is an infinite number of (non-similar) kites in which the diagonals are equal in length (and the kites are not any other named quadrilateral).

=== Lengths of the diagonals ===
The lengths of the diagonals in a convex quadrilateral ABCD can be calculated using the law of cosines on each triangle formed by one diagonal and two sides of the quadrilateral. Thus

$$p=\sqrt{a^2+b^2-2ab\cos{B}}=\sqrt{c^2+d^2-2cd\cos{D}}$$

and

$$q=\sqrt{a^2+d^2-2ad\cos{A}}=\sqrt{b^2+c^2-2bc\cos{C}}.$$

Other, more symmetric formulas for the lengths of the diagonals, are

$$p=\sqrt{\frac{(ac+bd)(ad+bc)-2abcd(\cos{B}+\cos{D})}{ab+cd}}$$

and

$$q=\sqrt{\frac{(ab+cd)(ac+bd)-2abcd(\cos{A}+\cos{C})}{ad+bc}}.$$

=== Generalizations of the parallelogram law and Ptolemy's theorem ===
In any convex quadrilateral ABCD, the sum of the squares of the four sides is equal to the sum of the squares of the two diagonals plus four times the square of the line segment connecting the midpoints of the diagonals. Thus

$$a^2 + b^2 + c^2 + d^2 = p^2 + q^2 + 4x^2$$

where x is the distance between the midpoints of the diagonals. This is sometimes known as Euler's quadrilateral theorem and is a generalization of the parallelogram law.

The German mathematician Carl Anton Bretschneider derived in 1842 the following generalization of Ptolemy's theorem, regarding the product of the diagonals in a convex quadrilateral

$$p^2q^2=a^2c^2+b^2d^2-2abcd\cos{(A+C)}.$$

This relation can be considered to be a law of cosines for a quadrilateral. In a cyclic quadrilateral, where A + C = 180°, it reduces to pq = ac + bd. Since cos (A + C) ≥ −1, it also gives a proof of Ptolemy's inequality.

=== Other metric relations ===
If X and Y are the feet of the normals from B and D to the diagonal AC = p in a convex quadrilateral ABCD with sides a = AB, b = BC, c = CD, d = DA, then

$$XY=\frac{|a^2+c^2-b^2-d^2|}{2p}.$$

In a convex quadrilateral ABCD with sides a = AB, b = BC, c = CD, d = DA, and where the diagonals intersect at E,

$$efgh(a+c+b+d)(a+c-b-d) = (agh+cef+beh+dfg)(agh+cef-beh-dfg)$$

where e = AE, f = BE, g = CE, and h = DE.

The shape and size of a convex quadrilateral are fully determined by the lengths of its sides in sequence and of one diagonal between two specified vertices. The two diagonals p, q and the four side lengths a, b, c, d of a quadrilateral are related by the Cayley-Menger determinant, as follows:

$$\det \begin{bmatrix}
0 & a^2 & p^2 & d^2 & 1 \\
a^2 &   0 & b^2 & q^2 & 1 \\
p^2 & b^2 &   0 & c^2 & 1 \\
d^2 & q^2 & c^2 &   0 & 1 \\
1 &   1 &   1 & 1   & 0
\end{bmatrix} = 0.$$

== Angle bisectors ==
The internal angle bisectors of a convex quadrilateral either form a cyclic quadrilateral (that is, the four intersection points of adjacent angle bisectors are concyclic) or they are concurrent. In the latter case the quadrilateral is a tangential quadrilateral.

In quadrilateral ABCD, if the angle bisectors of A and C meet on diagonal BD, then the angle bisectors of B and D meet on diagonal AC.

== Bimedians ==
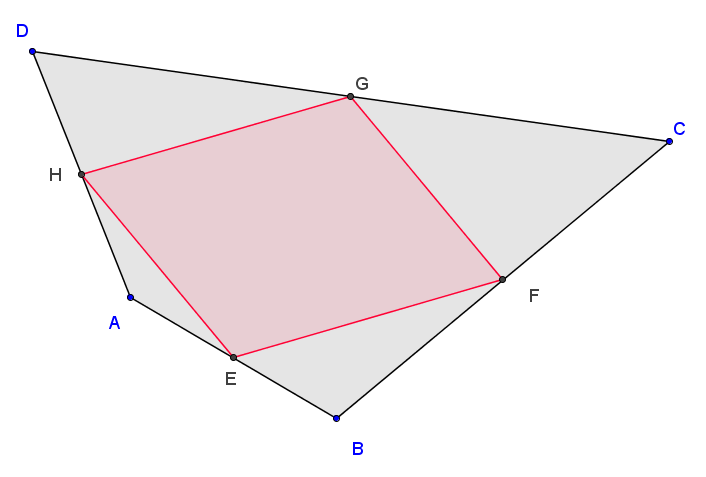
The Varignon parallelogram EFGH

The bimedians of a quadrilateral are the line segments connecting the midpoints of the opposite sides. The intersection of the bimedians is the centroid of the vertices of the quadrilateral.

The midpoints of the sides of any quadrilateral (convex, concave or crossed) are the vertices of a parallelogram called the Varignon parallelogram. It has the following properties:

- Each pair of opposite sides of the Varignon parallelogram are parallel to a diagonal in the original quadrilateral.
- A side of the Varignon parallelogram is half as long as the diagonal in the original quadrilateral it is parallel to.
- The area of the Varignon parallelogram equals half the area of the original quadrilateral. This is true in convex, concave and crossed quadrilaterals provided the area of the latter is defined to be the difference of the areas of the two triangles it is composed of.
- The perimeter of the Varignon parallelogram equals the sum of the diagonals of the original quadrilateral.
- The diagonals of the Varignon parallelogram are the bimedians of the original quadrilateral.

The two bimedians in a quadrilateral and the line segment joining the midpoints of the diagonals in that quadrilateral are concurrent and are all bisected by their point of intersection.

In a convex quadrilateral with sides a, b, c and d, the length of the bimedian that connects the midpoints of the sides a and c is

$$m=\tfrac{1}{2}\sqrt{-a^2+b^2-c^2+d^2+p^2+q^2}$$

where p and q are the length of the diagonals. The length of the bimedian that connects the midpoints of the sides b and d is

$$n=\tfrac{1}{2}\sqrt{a^2-b^2+c^2-d^2+p^2+q^2}.$$

Hence

$$\displaystyle p^2+q^2=2(m^2+n^2).$$

This is also a corollary to the parallelogram law applied in the Varignon parallelogram.

The lengths of the bimedians can also be expressed in terms of two opposite sides and the distance x between the midpoints of the diagonals. This is possible when using Euler's quadrilateral theorem in the above formulas. Whence

$$m=\tfrac{1}{2}\sqrt{2(b^2+d^2)-4x^2}$$

and

$$n=\tfrac{1}{2}\sqrt{2(a^2+c^2)-4x^2}.$$

Note that the two opposite sides in these formulas are not the two that the bimedian connects.

In a convex quadrilateral, there is the following dual connection between the bimedians and the diagonals:

- The two bimedians have equal length if and only if the two diagonals are perpendicular.
- The two bimedians are perpendicular if and only if the two diagonals have equal length.

== Trigonometric identities ==
The four angles of a simple quadrilateral ABCD satisfy the following identities:

$$\sin A + \sin B + \sin C + \sin D = 4\sin\tfrac12(A+B)\, \sin\tfrac12(A+C)\, \sin\tfrac12(A+D)$$

and

$$\frac{\tan A\,\tan{B} - \tan C\,\tan D}{\tan A\,\tan C - \tan B\,\tan D}
= \frac{\tan(A+C)}{\tan(A+B)}.$$

Also,

$$\frac{\tan A + \tan B + \tan C + \tan D}{\cot A + \cot B + \cot C + \cot D}
= \tan{A}\tan{B}\tan{C}\tan{D}.$$

In the last two formulas, no angle is allowed to be a right angle, since tan 90° is not defined.

Let $a$, $b$, $c$, $d$ be the sides of a convex quadrilateral, $s$ is the semiperimeter, and $A$ and $C$ are opposite angles, then

$$ad\sin^2\tfrac12 A + bc\cos^2\tfrac12C = (s-a)(s-d)$$

and

$$bc\sin^2\tfrac12 C + ad\cos^2\tfrac12 A = (s-b)(s-c)$$.

We can use these identities to derive the Bretschneider's Formula.

== Inequalities ==
=== Area ===
If a convex quadrilateral has the consecutive sides a, b, c, d and the diagonals p, q, then its area K satisfies

$K\le \tfrac{1}{4}(a+c)(b+d)$ with equality only for a rectangle.
$K\le \tfrac{1}{4}(a^2+b^2+c^2+d^2)$ with equality only for a square.
$K\le \tfrac{1}{4}(p^2+q^2)$ with equality only if the diagonals are perpendicular and equal.
$K\le \tfrac{1}{2}\sqrt{(a^2+c^2)(b^2+d^2)}$ with equality only for a rectangle.

From Bretschneider's formula it directly follows that the area of a quadrilateral satisfies

$$K \le \sqrt{(s-a)(s-b)(s-c)(s-d)}$$

with equality if and only if the quadrilateral is cyclic or degenerate such that one side is equal to the sum of the other three (it has collapsed into a line segment, so the area is zero).

Also,

$$K \leq \sqrt{abcd},$$

with equality for a bicentric quadrilateral or a rectangle.

The area of any quadrilateral also satisfies the inequality

$$\displaystyle K\le \tfrac{1}{2}\sqrt[3]{(ab+cd)(ac+bd)(ad+bc)}.$$

Denoting the perimeter as L, we have

$$K\le \tfrac{1}{16}L^2,$$

with equality only in the case of a square.

The area of a convex quadrilateral also satisfies

$$K \le \tfrac{1}{2}pq$$

for diagonal lengths p and q, with equality if and only if the diagonals are perpendicular.

Let a, b, c, d be the lengths of the sides of a convex quadrilateral ABCD with the area K and diagonals AC = p, BD = q. Then

$K \leq \tfrac18(a^2+b^2+c^2+d^2+p^2+q^2+pq-ac-bd)$ with equality only for a square.

Let a, b, c, d be the lengths of the sides of a convex quadrilateral ABCD with the area K, then the following inequality holds:

$K \leq \frac{1}{3+\sqrt{3}}(ab+ac+ad+bc+bd+cd) - \frac{1}{2(1+\sqrt{3})^2}(a^2+b^2+c^2+d^2)$ with equality only for a square.

=== Diagonals and bimedians ===
A corollary to Euler's quadrilateral theorem is the inequality

$$a^2 + b^2 + c^2 + d^2 \ge p^2 + q^2$$

where equality holds if and only if the quadrilateral is a parallelogram.

Euler also generalized Ptolemy's theorem, which is an equality in a cyclic quadrilateral, into an inequality for a convex quadrilateral. It states that

$$pq \le ac + bd$$

where there is equality if and only if the quadrilateral is cyclic. This is often called Ptolemy's inequality.

In any convex quadrilateral the bimedians m, n and the diagonals p, q are related by the inequality

$$pq \leq m^2+n^2,$$

with equality holding if and only if the diagonals are equal. This follows directly from the quadrilateral identity $m^2+n^2=\tfrac{1}{2}(p^2+q^2).$

=== Sides ===
The sides a, b, c, and d of any quadrilateral satisfy

$$a^2+b^2+c^2 > \tfrac13 d^2$$

and

$$a^4+b^4+c^4 \geq \tfrac1{27} d^4.$$

== Maximum and minimum properties ==
Among all quadrilaterals with a given perimeter, the one with the largest area is the square. This is called the isoperimetric theorem for quadrilaterals. It is a direct consequence of the area inequality

$$K\le \tfrac{1}{16}L^2$$

where K is the area of a convex quadrilateral with perimeter L. Equality holds if and only if the quadrilateral is a square. The dual theorem states that of all quadrilaterals with a given area, the square has the shortest perimeter.

The quadrilateral with given side lengths that has the maximum area is the cyclic quadrilateral.

Of all convex quadrilaterals with given diagonals, the orthodiagonal quadrilateral has the largest area. This is a direct consequence of the fact that the area of a convex quadrilateral satisfies

$$K=\tfrac{1}{2}pq\sin{\theta}\le \tfrac{1}{2}pq,$$

where θ is the angle between the diagonals p and q. Equality holds if and only if θ = 90°.

If P is an interior point in a convex quadrilateral ABCD, then

$$AP+BP+CP+DP\ge AC+BD.$$

From this inequality it follows that the point inside a quadrilateral that minimizes the sum of distances to the vertices is the intersection of the diagonals. Hence that point is the Fermat point of a convex quadrilateral.

== Remarkable points and lines in a convex quadrilateral ==
The centre of a quadrilateral can be defined in several different ways. The "vertex centroid" comes from considering the quadrilateral as being empty but having equal masses at its vertices. The "side centroid" comes from considering the sides to have constant mass per unit length. The usual centre, called just centroid (centre of area) comes from considering the surface of the quadrilateral as having constant density. These three points are in general not all the same point.

The "vertex centroid" is the intersection of the two bimedians. As with any polygon, the x and y coordinates of the vertex centroid are the arithmetic means of the x and y coordinates of the vertices.

The "area centroid" of quadrilateral ABCD can be constructed in the following way. Let G_{a}, G_{b}, G_{c}, G_{d} be the centroids of triangles BCD, ACD, ABD, ABC respectively. Then the "area centroid" is the intersection of the lines G_{a}G_{c} and G_{b}G_{d}.

In a general convex quadrilateral ABCD, there are no natural analogies to the circumcenter and orthocenter of a triangle. But two such points can be constructed in the following way. Let O_{a}, O_{b}, O_{c}, O_{d} be the circumcenters of triangles BCD, ACD, ABD, ABC respectively; and denote by H_{a}, H_{b}, H_{c}, H_{d} the orthocenters in the same triangles. Then the intersection of the lines O_{a}O_{c} and O_{b}O_{d} is called the quasicircumcenter, and the intersection of the lines H_{a}H_{c} and H_{b}H_{d} is called the quasiorthocenter of the convex quadrilateral. These points can be used to define an Euler line of a quadrilateral. In a convex quadrilateral, the quasiorthocenter H, the "area centroid" G, and the quasicircumcenter O are collinear in this order, and HG = 2GO.

There can also be defined a quasinine-point center E as the intersection of the lines E_{a}E_{c} and E_{b}E_{d}, where E_{a}, E_{b}, E_{c}, E_{d} are the nine-point centers of triangles BCD, ACD, ABD, ABC respectively. Then E is the midpoint of OH.

Another remarkable line in a convex non-parallelogram quadrilateral is the Newton line, which connects the midpoints of the diagonals, the segment connecting these points being bisected by the vertex centroid. One more interesting line (in some sense dual to the Newton's one) is the line connecting the point of intersection of diagonals with the vertex centroid. The line is remarkable by the fact that it contains the (area) centroid. The vertex centroid divides the segment connecting the intersection of diagonals and the (area) centroid in the ratio 3:1.

For any quadrilateral ABCD with points P and Q the intersections of AD and BC and AB and CD, respectively, the circles (PAB), (PCD), (QAD), and (QBC) pass through a common point M, called a Miquel point.

For a convex quadrilateral ABCD in which E is the point of intersection of the diagonals and F is the point of intersection of the extensions of sides BC and AD, let ω be a circle through E and F which meets CB internally at M and DA internally at N. Let CA meet ω again at L and let DB meet ω again at K. Then, applying Pascal's theorem to the hexagons EKNFML and EKMFNL inscribed in ω, there holds: the straight lines NK and ML intersect at point P that is located on the side AB; the straight lines NL and KM intersect at point Q that is located on the side CD. Points P and Q are called "Pascal points" formed by circle ω on sides AB and CD.

== Other properties of convex quadrilaterals ==
- If exterior squares are drawn on all sides of a quadrilateral then the segments connecting the centers of opposite squares are (a) equal in length, and (b) perpendicular. Thus these centers are the vertices of an orthodiagonal quadrilateral. This is called Van Aubel's theorem.
- For any simple quadrilateral with given edge lengths, there is a cyclic quadrilateral with the same edge lengths.
- The four smaller triangles formed by the diagonals and sides of a convex quadrilateral have the property that the product of the areas of two opposite triangles equals the product of the areas of the other two triangles.
- Let vectors AC and BD form the diagonals from A to C and from B to D. The angle $\theta$ at the intersection of the diagonals satisfies
  $$\cos \theta = \frac{b^2+d^2-a^2-c^2}{2pq},$$
  where $\theta$ is the angle between AC and BD, and $p, q$ are the diagonals of the quadrilateral.

== Taxonomy ==
A taxonomy of quadrilaterals, using a Hasse diagram

A hierarchical taxonomy of quadrilaterals is illustrated by the figure to the right. Lower classes are special cases of higher classes they are connected to. Note that "trapezoid" here is referring to the North American definition (the British equivalent is a trapezium). Inclusive definitions are used throughout.

== Skew quadrilaterals ==
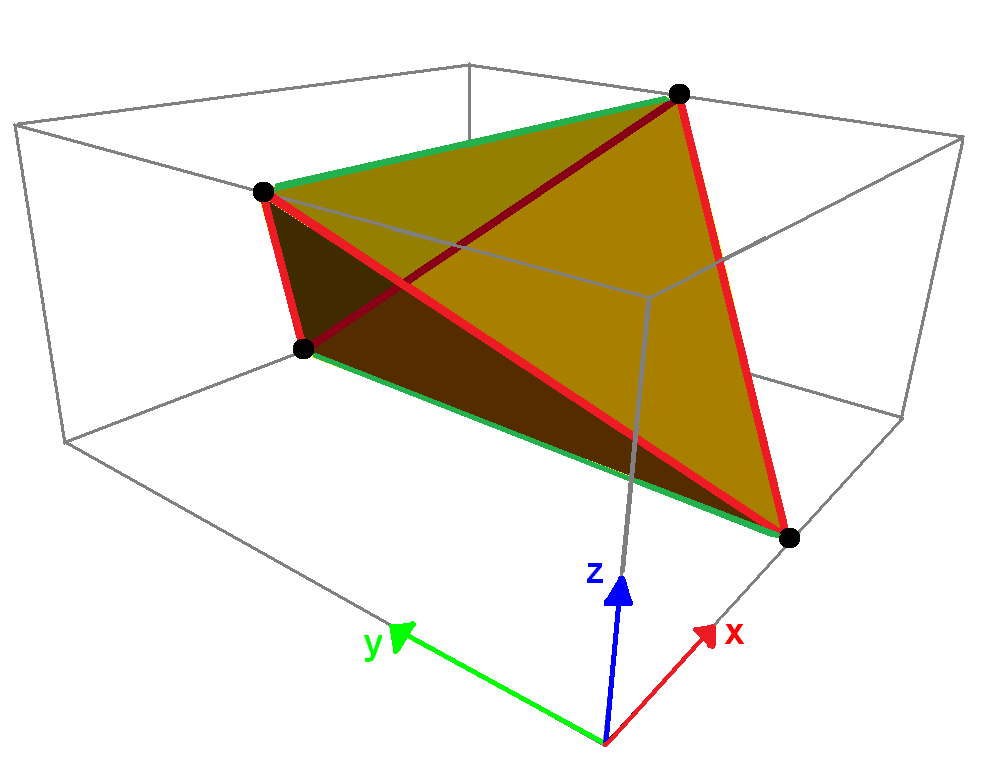
The (red) side edges of tetragonal disphenoid represent a regular zig-zag skew quadrilateral.

A generalization of ordinary quadrilaterals to non-planar figures is called a skew quadrilateral, a four-sided skew polygon. Formulas to compute its dihedral angles from the edge lengths and the angle between two adjacent edges were derived for work on the properties of molecules such as cyclobutane that contain a "puckered" ring of four atoms. Historically the term gauche quadrilateral was also used to mean a skew quadrilateral. A skew quadrilateral together with its diagonals form a (possibly non-regular) tetrahedron, and conversely every skew quadrilateral comes from a tetrahedron where a pair of opposite edges is removed.

== See also ==
- Complete quadrangle
- Perpendicular bisector construction of a quadrilateral
- Saccheri quadrilateral
- Types of mesh § Quadrilateral
- Quadrangle (geography)
- Homography - Any quadrilateral can be transformed into another quadrilateral by a projective transformation (homography)
