= Trapezoid =

Convex quadrilateral with at least one pair of parallel sides

Trapezoid (American English) Trapezium (British English)
- Trapezoid or trapezium
- Type: quadrilateral
- Edges and vertices: 4
- Area: $\tfrac12(a + b) h$
- Properties: convex

In geometry, a trapezoid (/ˈtræpəzɔɪd/) in North American English or trapezium (/trəˈpiːziəm/) in British English is a quadrilateral that has at least one pair of parallel sides.

The parallel sides are called the bases of the trapezoid. The other two sides are called the legs or lateral sides. If the trapezoid is a parallelogram, then the choice of bases and legs is arbitrary.

A trapezoid is usually considered to be a convex quadrilateral in Euclidean geometry, but there are also crossed cases. If shape ABCD is a convex trapezoid, then the ABDC is a crossed trapezoid. The metric formulas in this article apply in convex trapezoids.

== Definitions ==
Trapezoid can be defined exclusively or inclusively. Under an exclusive definition a trapezoid is a quadrilateral having exactly one pair of parallel sides, with the other pair of opposite sides non-parallel. Parallelograms including rhombi, rectangles, and squares are then not considered to be trapezoids. Under an inclusive definition, a trapezoid is any quadrilateral with at least one pair of parallel sides. In an inclusive classification scheme, definitions are hierarchical: a square is a type of rectangle and a type of rhombus, a rectangle or rhombus is a type of parallelogram, and every parallelogram is a type of trapezoid. A trapezoid can also be defined as any quadrilateral that is not a parallelogram; this definition is also exclusive and is used in Euclid's Elements.

Professional mathematicians and post-secondary geometry textbooks nearly always prefer inclusive definitions and classifications, because they simplify statements and proofs of geometric theorems. In primary and secondary education, definitions of rectangle and parallelogram are also nearly always inclusive, but an exclusive definition of trapezoid is commonly found. This article uses the inclusive definition and considers parallelograms to be special kinds of trapezoids. (cf. Quadrilateral § Taxonomy)

To avoid confusion, some sources use the term proper trapezoid to describe trapezoids with exactly one pair of parallel sides, analogous to uses of the word proper in some other mathematical objects.

== Etymology ==
In the ancient Greek geometry of Euclid's Elements (c. 300 BC), quadrilaterals were classified into exclusive categories: square; oblong (non-square rectangle); (non-square) rhombus; rhomboid, meaning a non-rhombus non-rectangle parallelogram; or trapezium (τραπέζιον, literally "table"), meaning any quadrilateral not already included in the previous categories.

The Neoplatonist philosopher Proclus (mid 5th century AD) wrote an influential commentary on Euclid with a richer set of categories, which he attributed to Posidonius (c. 100 BC). In this scheme, a quadrilateral can be a parallelogram or a non-parallelogram. A parallelogram can itself be a square, an oblong (non-square rectangle), a rhombus, or a rhomboid (non-rhombus non-rectangle). A non-parallelogram can be a trapezium with exactly one pair of parallel sides, which can be isosceles (with equal legs) or scalene (with unequal legs); or a trapezoid (τραπεζοειδή, literally "table-like") with no parallel sides.

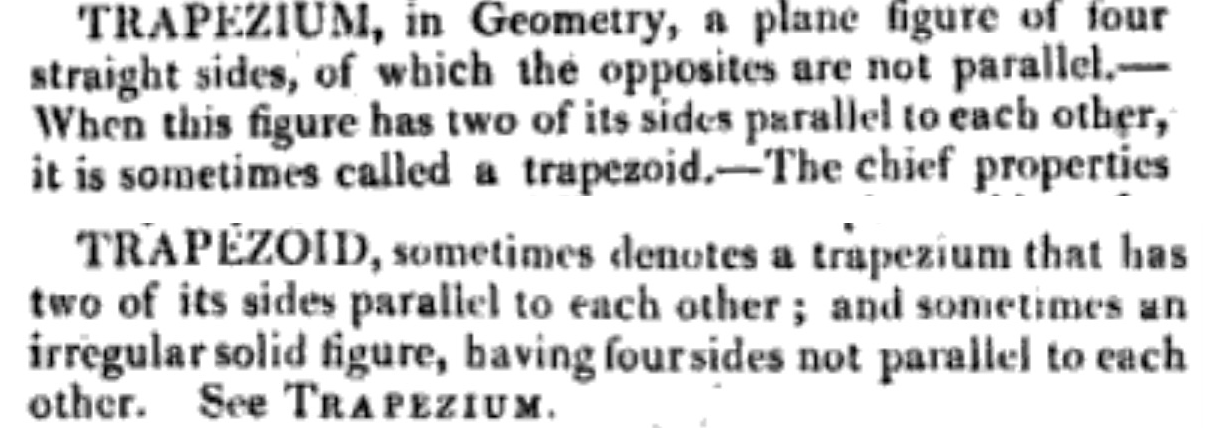
Hutton's definitions in 1795

All European languages except American English follow Proclus's meanings of trapezium and trapezoid,. However, the meaning in British English was reversed for much of the 19th century. In 1795, an influential mathematical dictionary published by Charles Hutton transposed the two terms without explanation, leading to widespread inconsistency. Hutton's change was reverted in British English in about 1875, but it has been retained in American English to the present. Late 19th century American geometry textbooks define a trapezium as having no parallel sides, a trapezoid as having exactly one pair of parallel sides, and a parallelogram as having two sets of opposing parallel sides. To avoid confusion between contradictory British and American meanings of trapezium and trapezoid, quadrilaterals with no parallel sides have sometimes been called irregular quadrilaterals.

== Special cases ==
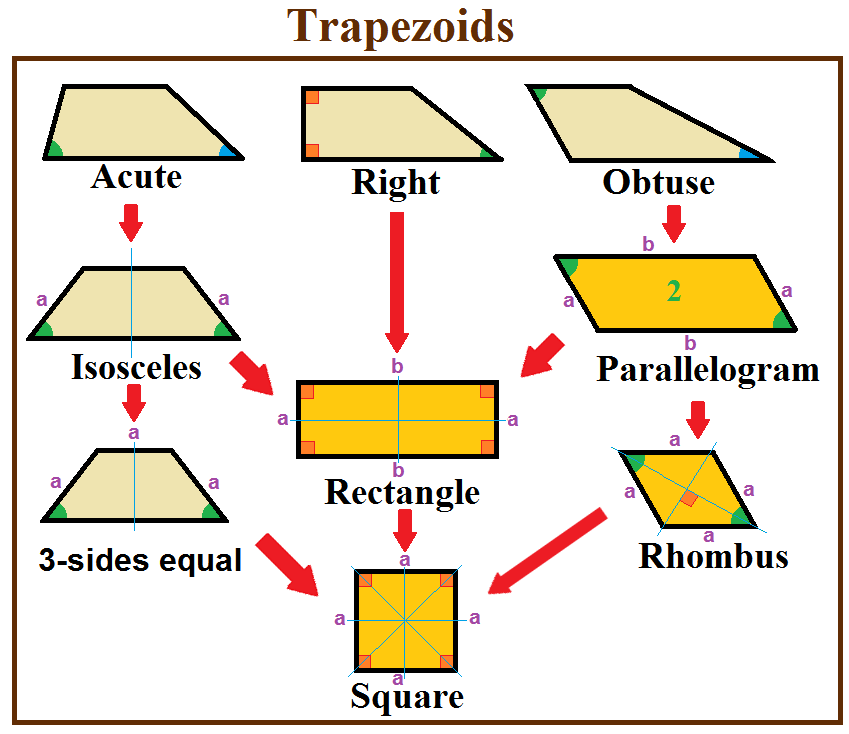
Trapezoid special cases. The orange figures also qualify as parallelograms.

An isosceles trapezoid is a trapezoid where the base angles have the same measure. As a consequence the two legs are also of equal length and it has reflection symmetry. This is possible for acute trapezoids or right trapezoids as rectangles. An acute trapezoid is a trapezoid with two adjacent acute angles on its longer base, and the isosceles trapezoid is an example of an acute trapezoid. The isosceles trapezoid has a special case known as a three-sided trapezoid, meaning it is a trapezoid wherein two trapezoid's legs have equal lengths as the trapezoid's base at the top. The isosceles trapezoid is the convex hull of an antiparallelogram, a type of crossed quadrilateral. Every antiparallelogram is formed with such a trapezoid by replacing two parallel sides by the two diagonals.

An obtuse trapezoid, on the other hand, has one acute and one obtuse angle on each base. An example is parallelogram with equal acute angles.

A right trapezoid is a trapezoid with two adjacent right angles. One special type of right trapezoid is by forming three right triangles, which was used by James Garfield to prove the Pythagorean theorem.

A tangential trapezoid is a trapezoid that has an incircle.

== Condition of existence ==
Four lengths a, c, b, d can constitute the consecutive sides of a non-parallelogram trapezoid with a and b parallel only when
$$\displaystyle |d-c| < |b-a| < d+c.$$

The quadrilateral is a parallelogram when $d-c = b-a = 0$, but it is an ex-tangential quadrilateral (which is not a trapezoid) when $|d-c| = |b-a| \neq 0$.

== Characterizations ==
general trapezoid/trapezium: parallel sides: $a,\, b$ with $a<b$ legs: $c,\, d$ diagonals: $q,\, p$ midsegment: $m$ height/altitude: $h$

trapezoid/trapezium with opposing triangles $S,\,T$ formed by the diagonals

Given a convex quadrilateral, the following properties are equivalent, and each implies that the quadrilateral is a trapezoid:

- It has two adjacent angles that are supplementary, that is, they add up to 180 degrees.
- The angle between a side and a diagonal is equal to the angle between the opposite side and the same diagonal.
- The diagonals cut each other in mutually the same ratio (this ratio is the same as that between the lengths of the parallel sides).
- The diagonals cut the quadrilateral into four triangles of which one opposite pair have equal areas.
- The product of the areas of the two triangles formed by one diagonal equals the product of the areas of the two triangles formed by the other diagonal.
- The areas S and T of some two opposite triangles of the four triangles formed by the diagonals satisfy the equation
  $$\sqrt{K} = \sqrt{S}+\sqrt{T},$$
  where K is the area of the quadrilateral.
- The midpoints of two opposite sides of the trapezoid and the intersection of the diagonals are collinear.
- The angles in the quadrilateral ABCD satisfy $\sin A\sin C=\sin B\sin D.$
- The cosines of two adjacent angles sum to 0, as do the cosines of the other two angles.
- The cotangents of two adjacent angles sum to 0, as do the cotangents of the other two adjacent angles.
- One bimedian divides the quadrilateral into two quadrilaterals of equal areas.
- Twice the length of the bimedian connecting the midpoints of two opposite sides equals the sum of the lengths of the other sides.

Additionally, the following properties are equivalent, and each implies that opposite sides a and b are parallel:

- The consecutive sides a, c, b, d and the diagonals p, q satisfy the equation
  $$p^2+q^2=c^2+d^2+2ab.$$
- The distance v between the midpoints of the diagonals satisfies the equation
  $$v=\frac{|a-b|}{2}.$$

== Properties ==
=== Midsegment and height ===
The midsegment or median of a trapezoid is the segment that joins the midpoints of the legs. It is parallel to the bases. Its length m is equal to the average of the lengths of the bases a and b of the trapezoid,
$$m = \frac{a + b}{2}.$$

The midsegment of a trapezoid is one of the two bimedians (the other bimedian divides the trapezoid into equal areas).

The height (or altitude) is the perpendicular distance between the bases. In the case that the two bases have different lengths (a ≠ b), the height of a trapezoid h can be determined by the length of its four sides using the formula
$$h= \frac{\sqrt{(p-2a)(p-2b)(p-2b-2d)(p-2b-2c)}}{2|b-a|}$$
where c and d are the lengths of the legs and $p = a+b+c+d$.

=== Area ===
The area $K$ of a trapezoid is given by the product of the midsegment (the average of the two bases) and the height:
$$K = \tfrac{1}{2} (a + b) h =\tfrac{1}{2} (a + b) c\sin A$$
where $a$ and $b$ are the lengths of the bases, and $h(=c\sin A)$ is the height (the perpendicular distance between these sides). This method was used in the classical age of India in Aryabhata's Aryabhatiya (section 2.8), yielding as a special case the well-known formula for the area of a triangle, by considering a triangle as a degenerate trapezoid in which one of the parallel sides has shrunk to a point.

The 7th-century Indian mathematician Bhāskara I derived the following formula for the area of a trapezoid with consecutive sides $a$, $c$, $b$, $d$:
$$K = \frac{1}{2}(a+b)\sqrt{c^2-\frac{1}{4}\left((b-a)+\frac{c^2-d^2}{b-a}\right)^2}$$
where $a$ and $b$ are parallel and $b > a$. This formula can be factored into a more symmetric version
$$K = \frac{a+b}{4|b-a|}\sqrt{(-a+b+c+d)(a-b+c+d)(a-b+c-d)(a-b-c+d)}.$$
When one of the parallel sides has shrunk to a point (say a = 0), this formula reduces to Heron's formula for the area of a triangle.

Another equivalent formula for the area, which more closely resembles Heron's formula, is
$$K = \frac{a+b}{|b-a|}\sqrt{(s-b)(s-a)(s-b-c)(s-b-d)}$$
where $s = \tfrac{1}{2}(a + b + c + d)$ is the semiperimeter of the trapezoid. (This formula is similar to Brahmagupta's formula, but it differs from it, in that a trapezoid might not be cyclic (inscribed in a circle). The formula is also a special case of Bretschneider's formula for a general quadrilateral).

From Bretschneider's formula, it follows that
$$K= \sqrt{\frac{\left(ab^2-a^2 b-ad^2+bc^2\right)\left(ab^2-a^2 b-ac^2+bd^2\right)}{4(b-a)^2} - \left(\frac{c^2+d^2-a^2-b^2}{4}\right)^2}.$$

The bimedian connecting the parallel sides bisects the area. More generally, any line drawn through the midpoint of the median parallel to the bases, that intersects the bases, bisects the area. Any triangle connecting the two ends of one leg to the midpoint of the other leg is also half of the area.

=== Diagonals ===
The lengths of the diagonals are
$$\begin{align}
p &= \sqrt{\frac{ab^2-a^2b-ac^2+bd^2}{b-a}}, \\
q &= \sqrt{\frac{ab^2-a^2b-ad^2+bc^2}{b-a}},
\end{align}$$
where $a$ is the short base, $b$ is the long base, and $c$ and $d$ are the trapezoid legs.

If the trapezoid is divided into four triangles by its diagonals AC and BD (as shown on the right), intersecting at O, then the area of $\triangle$ AOD is equal to that of $\triangle$ BOC, and the product of the areas of $\triangle$ AOD and $\triangle$ BOC is equal to that of $\triangle$ AOB and $\triangle$ COD. The ratio of the areas of each pair of adjacent triangles is the same as that between the lengths of the parallel sides.

If $\ell$ is the length of the line segment parallel to the bases, passing through the intersection of the diagonals, with one endpoint on each leg, then $\ell$ is the harmonic mean of the lengths of the bases:
$$\frac{1}{\ell}=\frac{1}{2} \left( \frac{1}{a}+ \frac{1}{b} \right).$$

The line that goes through both the intersection point of the extended nonparallel sides and the intersection point of the diagonals, bisects each base.

=== Other properties ===
The center of area (center of mass for a uniform lamina) lies along the line segment joining the midpoints of the parallel sides, at a perpendicular distance x from the longer side b given by
$$x = \frac{h}{3} \left( \frac{2a+b}{a+b}\right).$$

The center of area divides this segment in the ratio (when taken from the short to the long side)

$$\frac{a+2b}{2a+b}.$$

If the angle bisectors to angles A and B intersect at P, and the angle bisectors to angles C and D intersect at Q, then
$$PQ=\frac{|AD+BC-AB-CD|}{2}.$$

== Applications ==
The trapezoidal rule for numerical integration

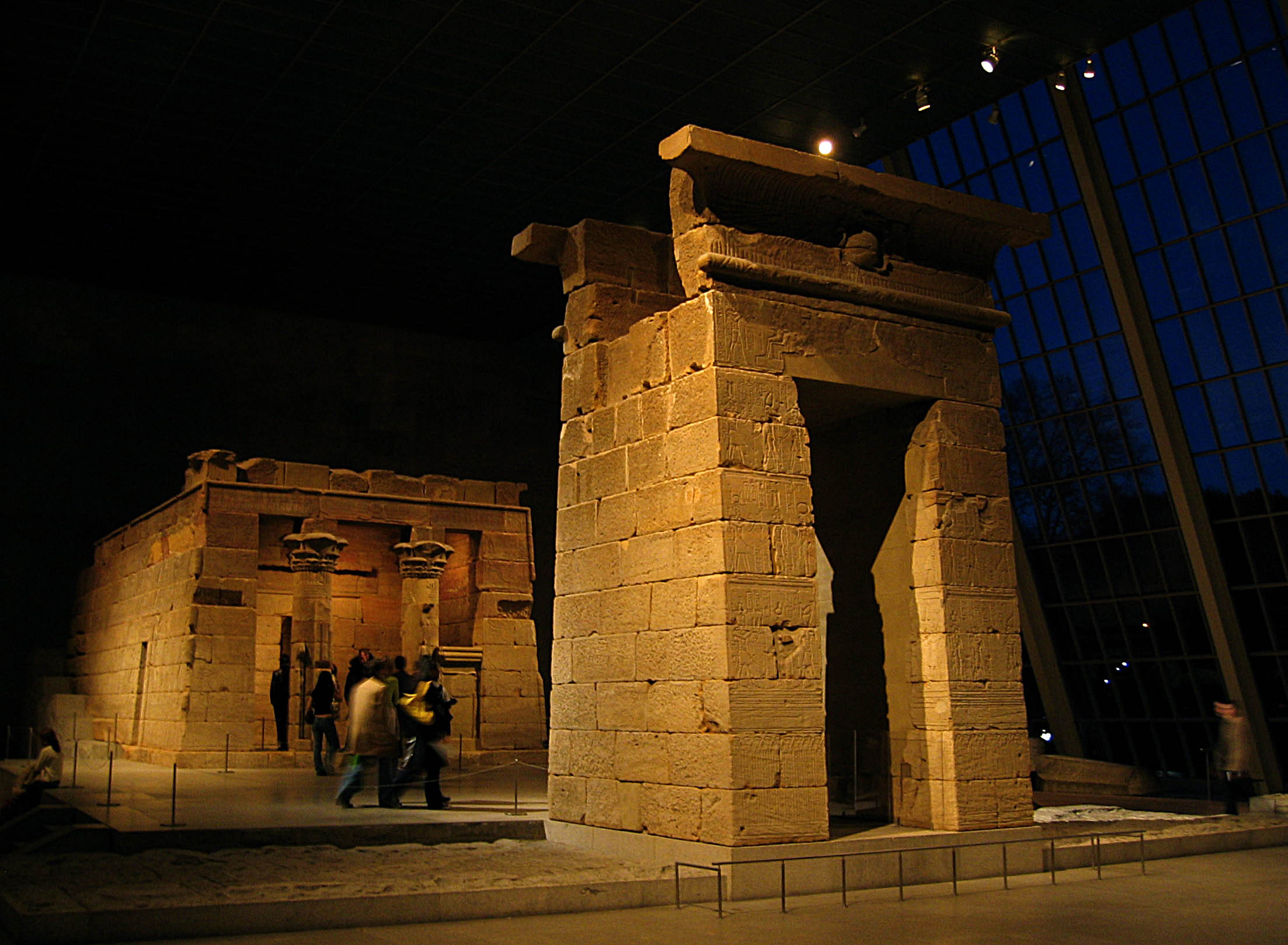
The Temple of Dendur in the Metropolitan Museum of Art in New York City

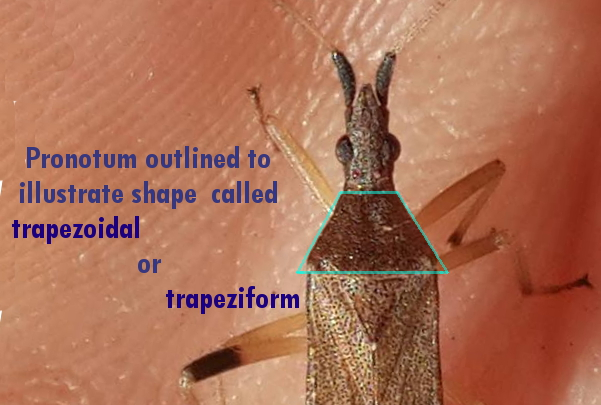
Example of a trapeziform pronotum outlined on a spurge bug

Ontario Highway 502

In calculus, the definite integral of a function $f(x)$ can be numerically approximated as a discrete sum by partitioning the interval of integration into small uniform intervals and approximating the function's value on each interval as the average of the values at its endpoints:
$$\int_{a}^{b} f(x)\, dx \approx \sum_{k=1}^{N} \tfrac12 \bigl( f(x_{k-1}) + f(x_{k}) \bigr) \Delta x,$$
where $N$ is the number of intervals, $x_0 = a$, $x_N = b$, and $\Delta x = (b - a) / N$. Graphically, this amounts to approximating the region under the graph of the function by a collection of trapezoids, so this method is called the trapezoidal rule.

When any rectangle is viewed in perspective from a position which is centered on one axis but not the other, it appears to be an isosceles trapezoid, called the keystone effect because arch keystones are commonly trapezoidal. For example, when a rectangular building façade is photographed from the ground at a position directly in front using a rectilinear lens, the image of the building is an isosceles trapezoid. Such photographs sometimes have a "keystone transformation" applied to them to recover rectangular shapes. Video projectors sometimes apply such a keystone transformation to the recorded image before projection, so that the image projected on a flat screen appears undistorted.

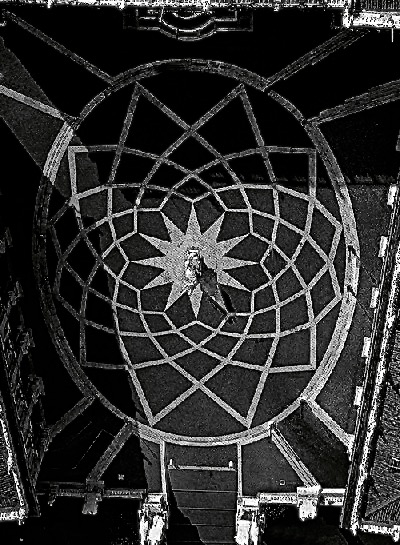
Piazza del Campidoglio viewed from directly above.

Trapezoidal doors and windows were the standard style for the Inca, although it can be found used by earlier cultures of the same region and did not necessarily originate with them. An almena, a battlement feature characteristic of Moorish architecture, is trapezoidal. Michaelangelo's redesign of the Piazza del Campidoglio (see photograph at right) incorporated a trapezoid surrounding an ellipse, giving the effect of a square surrounding a circle when seen foreshortened at ground level. Cinematography takes advantage of trapezoids in the opposite way, to produce an excessive foreshortening effect from the camera viewpoint, giving the illusion of greater depth to a room in a movie studio than the set physically has. Trapezoids were also used to produce the visual distortions of Caligarism. Canals and drainage ditches commonly have a trapezoidal cross-section.

In biology, especially morphology and taxonomy, terms such as trapezoidal or trapeziform commonly are useful in descriptions of particular organs or forms.

Trapezoids are sometimes used as a graphical symbol. In circuit diagrams, a trapezoid is the symbol for a multiplexer. An isosceles trapezoid is used for the shape of road signs, for example, on secondary highways in Ontario, Canada.

== Non-Euclidean geometry ==
In spherical or hyperbolic geometry, the internal angles of a quadrilateral do not sum to 360°, but quadrilaterals analogous to trapezoids, parallelograms, and rectangles can still be defined, and additionally there are a few new types of quadrilaterals not distinguished in the Euclidean case.

A spherical or hyperbolic trapezoid is a quadrilateral with two opposite sides, the legs, each of whose two adjacent angles sum to the same quantity; the other two sides are the bases. As in Euclidean geometry, special cases include isosceles trapezoids whose legs are equal (as are the angles adjacent to each base), parallelograms with two pairs of opposite equal angles and two pairs of opposite equal sides, rhombuses with two pairs of opposite equal angles and four equal sides, rectangles with four equal (non-right) angles and two pairs of opposite equal sides, and squares with four equal (non-right) angles and four equal sides.

When a rectangle is cut in half along the line through the midpoints of two opposite sides, each of the resulting two pieces is an isosceles trapezoid with two right angles, called a Saccheri quadrilateral. When a rectangle is cut into quarters by the two lines through pairs of opposite midpoints, each of the resulting four pieces is a quadrilateral with three right angles called a Lambert quadrilateral. In Euclidean geometry Saccheri and Lambert quadrilaterals are merely rectangles.

== Related topics ==
An example of trapezoidal number: 15 = 4 + 5 + 6

A trapezoidal number is a set of positive integers obtained by summing consecutively two or more positive integers greater than one, forming a trapezoidal pattern.

A crossed ladders problem is the problem of finding the distance between the parallel sides of a right trapezoid, given the diagonal lengths and the distance from the perpendicular leg to the diagonal intersection.

== See also ==
- Frustum, a solid having trapezoidal faces.
- Inscribed square problem#Curves without special trapezoids
- Trapezoid graph, an intersection graph resembling trapezoid.
- Trapezoidal distribution, a continuous probability distribution whose probability density function graph resembles a trapezoid.
- Trapezoidal thread form, a screw thread profile with trapezoidal outlines.
- Trapezoidal wing, straight-edged and tapered wing planform of an aircraft.
- Wedge, a polyhedron defined by two triangles and three trapezoid faces.

== Bibliography ==
- Alsina, Claudi; Nelsen, Roger (2020). A Cornucopia of Quadrilaterals. Mathematical Association of America. ISBN 978-1-4704-5312-1.
- Conway, John H.; Burgiel, Heidi; Goodman-Strauss, Chaim (2016). The Symmetries of Things. CRC Press. ISBN 978-1-4398-6489-0.
- Curl, James Stevens (1999). A Dictionary of Architecture. Oxford University Press. ISBN 9780198606789.
- Dodge, Clayton W. (2012). Euclidean Geometry and Transformations. Dover Books on Mathematics. Courier Corporation. ISBN 9780486138428.
- Hobbs, Charles Austin (1899). The Elements of Plane Geometry. A. Lovell & Company.
- Hopkins, George Irving (1891). Manual of Plane Geometry. D.C. Heath & Company.
- Josefsson, Martin (2013). "Characterizations of trapezoids" (PDF). Forum Geometricorum. 13: 23–35. Archived from the original (PDF) on 16 June 2013.
- Usiskin, Zalman; Griffin, Jennifer (2008). The Classification of Quadrilaterals: A Study of Definition. Information Age Publishing. pp. 49–52, 63–67.
- Ramírez, Juan Antonio (2012). "Architecture and Desire: The character of film constructions". Architecture for the Screen: A Critical Study of Set Design in Hollywood's Golden Age. Translated by Moffitt, John F. McFarland. ISBN 9780786469307.
