= Dinty =

Dinty may refer to:

== People ==
- William Colbeck (gangster) (1890–1943), American politician and organized crime figure
- Dinty Gearin (1897–1959), American baseball player
- Dinty Moore (American football) (born 1903), American football player
- Dinty W. Moore (born 1955), American essayist
- Francis Moore (ice hockey) (1900–1976), Canadian hockey player
- John "Dinty" Moore, a player in the 1932–33 St. Louis Soccer League season

== Other uses ==
- Dinty (film), a 1920 American silent film
- Dinty Moore, a character in Bringing Up Father, an American comic strip which ran from 1913 to 2000
- DINTY, a system of labelling for tetrads in the Ordnance Survey
