= Carl Anton Bretschneider =

German mathematician (1808–1878)

Bretschneider's formula allows for the calculation of the area of a general quadrilateral if the lengths of all sides are known.

Carl Anton Bretschneider (27 May 1808 – 6 November 1878) was a mathematician from Gotha, Germany. Bretschneider worked in geometry, number theory, and history of geometry. He also worked on logarithmic integrals and mathematical tables. He was one of the first mathematicians to use the symbol $\gamma$ for Euler's constant when he published his 1837 paper. He is best known for his discovery of Bretschneider's formula for the area of a general quadrilateral on a plane,

$A = \sqrt {(s-a)(s-b)(s-c)(s-d) - abcd \cdot \cos^2 \left(\frac{\alpha + \gamma}{2}\right)},$

where, $a, b, c,$ and $d$ are the sides of the quadrilateral, $s = \frac{a + b + c + d}{2}$ is the semiperimeter, and $\alpha$ and $\gamma$ are two opposite angles.

He is the son of Karl Gottlieb Bretschneider, a theologian.

== Publications ==
- Carl Anton Bretschneider (1837). "Theoriae logarithmi integralis lineamenta nova". Crelle Journal, vol.17, p. 257-285 (submitted 1835)

== See also ==
- Heron's formula
- Brahmagupta's formula
