= Crossed polygon =

2-D shapes in which sides intersect

A crossed equilateral pentagon

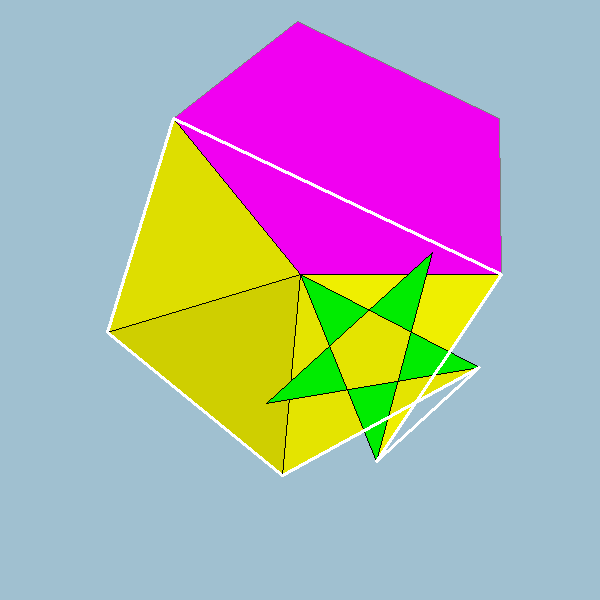
The vertex figure of a snub icosidodecadodecahedron is a crossed hexagon.

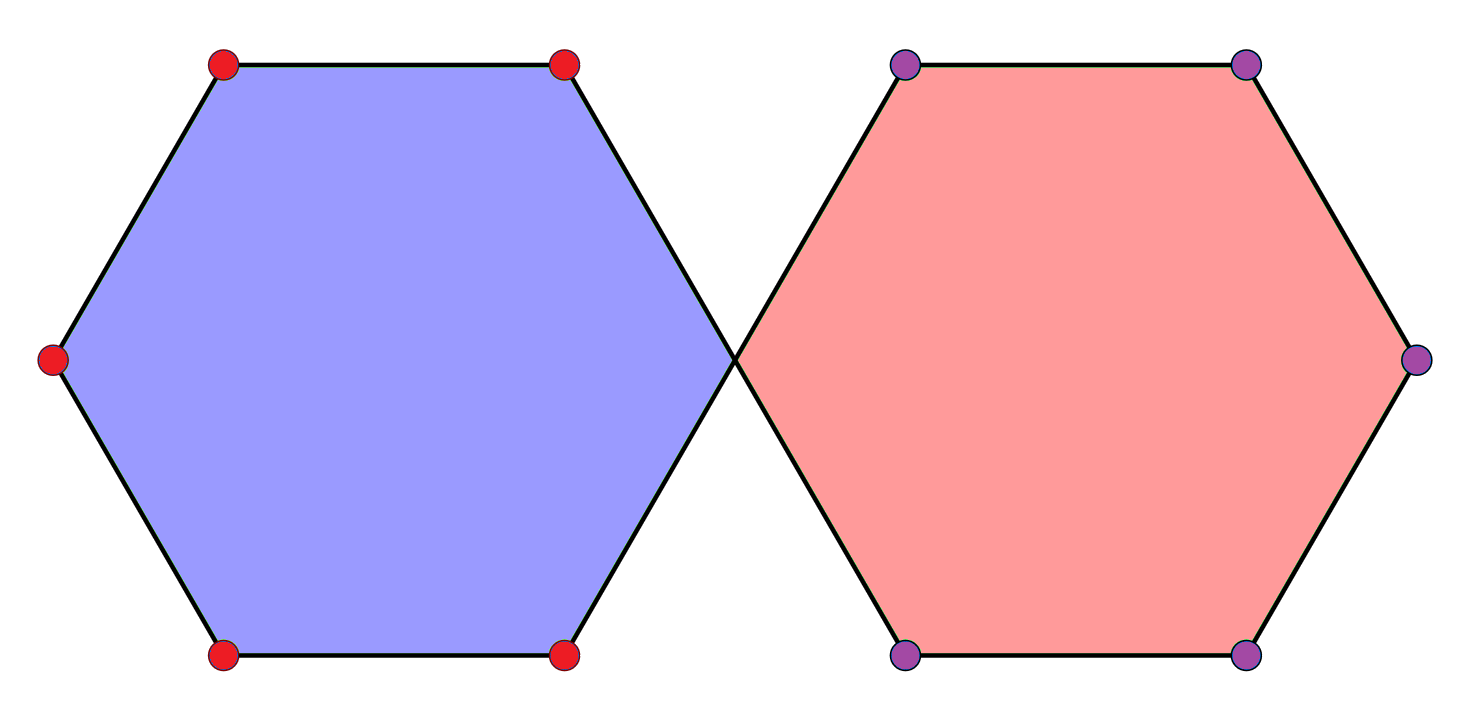
A symmetric crossed decagon

A crossed polygon is a polygon in the plane with a turning number or density of zero, with the appearance of a figure 8, infinity symbol, or lemniscate curve.

Crossed polygons are related to star polygons which have turning numbers greater than 1.

The vertices with clockwise turning angles equal the vertices with counterclockwise turning angles. A crossed polygon will always have at least 2 edges or vertices intersecting or coinciding.

Any convex polygon with 4 or more sides can be remade into a crossed polygon by swapping the positions of two adjacent vertices.

Crossed polygons are common as vertex figures of uniform star polyhedra.

== Crossed quadrilateral ==
Crossed quadrilaterals are most common, including:

- Crossed parallelogram or antiparallelogram, a crossed quadrilateral with alternate edges of equal length.
- Crossed trapezoid has two opposite parallel edges.
- Crossed rectangle, an antiparallelogram whose edges are two opposite sides and the two diagonals of a rectangle.
- Crossed square, a crossed rectangle with two equal opposite sides and two diagonals of a square.

Crossed square	Crossed trapezoid	Crossed parallelogram	Crossed rectangles	Crossed quadrilaterals

== See also ==
- Skew polygon
