= Hectad =

Term for a 10×10km square

A hectad is an area 10 km x 10 km square.

The term has a particular use in connection with the British Ordnance Survey national grid, and then refers to any of the 100 such squares which make up a standard 100 km x 100 km myriad; these are denoted using the letter code of the 100 km square, and then a two-digit number consisting of the one-digit easting of the western bound of the hectad and the one-digit northing of its southern bound.

== See also ==
- Tetrad (unit of area)
