= Bretschneider's formula =

Formula for the area of a quadrilateral

A quadrilateral.

In geometry, Bretschneider's formula is a mathematical expression for the area of a general quadrilateral. It works on both convex and concave quadrilaterals, whether it is cyclic or not.

== History ==
The German mathematician Carl Anton Bretschneider discovered the formula in 1842. The formula was also derived in the same year by the German mathematician Karl Georg Christian von Staudt.

== Formulation ==
Bretschneider's formula is expressed as:

$K = \sqrt {(s-a)(s-b)(s-c)(s-d) - abcd \cdot \cos^2 \left(\frac{\alpha + \gamma}{2}\right)}$

$$= \sqrt{(s-a)(s-b)(s-c)(s-d) - \tfrac{1}{2} abcd [ 1 + \cos (\alpha+ \gamma) ]} .$$

Here, a, b, c, d are the sides of the quadrilateral, s is the semiperimeter, and α and γ are any two opposite angles. Bretschneider's formula works on any quadrilateral, whether it is cyclic or not.

== Proof ==
Denote the area of the quadrilateral by K. Then we have

$$\begin{align} K &= \frac{a d \sin \alpha}{2} + \frac{b c \sin \gamma}{2}.\end{align}$$

Therefore

$$2K= (ad) \sin \alpha + (bc) \sin \gamma.$$
$$4K^2 = (ad)^2 \sin^2 \alpha + (bc)^2 \sin^2 \gamma + 2abcd \sin \alpha \sin \gamma.$$

The law of cosines implies that

$$a^2 + d^2 -2ad \cos \alpha = b^2 + c^2 -2bc \cos \gamma,$$

because both sides equal the square of the length of the diagonal BD. This can be rewritten as

$$\frac{(a^2 + d^2 - b^2 - c^2)^2}{4} = (ad)^2 \cos^2 \alpha +(bc)^2 \cos^2 \gamma -2 abcd \cos \alpha \cos \gamma.$$

Adding this to the above formula for 4K^{2} yields

$$\begin{align}
4K^2 + \frac{(a^2 + d^2 - b^2 - c^2)^2}{4} &= (ad)^2 + (bc)^2 - 2abcd \cos (\alpha + \gamma) \\
&= (ad+bc)^2-2abcd-2abcd\cos(\alpha+\gamma) \\
&= (ad+bc)^2 - 2abcd(\cos(\alpha+\gamma)+1) \\
&= (ad+bc)^2 - 4abcd\left(\frac{\cos(\alpha+\gamma)+1}{2}\right) \\
&= (ad + bc)^2 - 4abcd \cos^2 \left(\frac{\alpha + \gamma}{2}\right).
\end{align}$$

Note that: $\cos^2\frac{\alpha+\gamma}{2} = \frac{1+\cos(\alpha+\gamma)}{2}$ (a trigonometric identity true for all $\frac{\alpha+\gamma}{2}$)

Following the same steps as in Brahmagupta's formula, this can be written as

$$16K^2 = (a+b+c-d)(a+b-c+d)(a-b+c+d)(-a+b+c+d) - 16abcd \cos^2 \left(\frac{\alpha + \gamma}{2}\right).$$

Introducing the semiperimeter

$$s = \frac{a+b+c+d}{2},$$

the above becomes

$$16K^2 = 16(s-d)(s-c)(s-b)(s-a) - 16abcd \cos^2 \left(\frac{\alpha + \gamma}{2}\right)$$
$$K^2 = (s-a)(s-b)(s-c)(s-d) - abcd \cos^2 \left(\frac{\alpha + \gamma}{2}\right)$$

and Bretschneider's formula follows after taking the square root of both sides:

$$K = \sqrt {(s-a)(s-b)(s-c)(s-d) - abcd  \cdot \cos^2 \left(\frac{\alpha + \gamma}{2}\right)}$$

The second form is given by using the cosine half-angle identity

$$\cos^2 \left(\frac{\alpha + \gamma}{2}\right) = \frac {1 + \cos \left(\alpha + \gamma\right)}{2},$$

yielding

$$K = \sqrt{(s-a)(s-b)(s-c)(s-d) - \tfrac{1}{2} abcd [ 1 + \cos (\alpha+ \gamma) ]} .$$

Emmanuel García has used the generalized half angle formulas to give an alternative proof.

== Related formulae ==
Bretschneider's formula generalizes Brahmagupta's formula for the area of a cyclic quadrilateral, which in turn generalizes Heron's formula for the area of a triangle.

The trigonometric adjustment in Bretschneider's formula for non-cyclicality of the quadrilateral can be rewritten non-trigonometrically in terms of the sides and the diagonals e and f to give

$$\begin{align}
K &=\tfrac{1}{4}\sqrt{4e^2f^2-(b^2+d^2-a^2-c^2)^2} \\
&=\sqrt{(s-a)(s-b)(s-c)(s-d) - \tfrac{1}{4}((ac+bd)^2-e^2f^2)} \\
&=\sqrt{(s-a)(s-b)(s-c)(s-d) - \tfrac{1}{4}(ac+bd+ef)(ac+bd-ef)} \\
\end{align}$$

== References & further reading ==
- Ayoub, Ayoub B. (2007). "Generalizations of Ptolemy and Brahmagupta Theorems". Mathematics and Computer Education. 41 (1). ISSN 0730-8639.
- C. A. Bretschneider. Untersuchung der trigonometrischen Relationen des geradlinigen Viereckes. Archiv der Mathematik und Physik, Band 2, 1842, S. 225-261 (online copy, German)
- F. Strehlke: Zwei neue Sätze vom ebenen und sphärischen Viereck und Umkehrung des Ptolemaischen Lehrsatzes. Archiv der Mathematik und Physik, Band 2, 1842, S. 323-326 (online copy, German)
