= Tetrad (area) =

A tetrad is an area 2 km x 2 km square. The term refers to any of the 25 such squares which make up a standard hectad.

The term comes from the Greek word tetras meaning "four".

Tetrads are sometimes used by biologists for reporting the distribution of species to maintain a degree of confidentiality about their data, though the system is not in universal use.

The tetrads are labelled from A to Z (omitting O) according to the "DINTY" system as shown in the grid below, which takes its name from the letters of the second line.

E	J	P	U	Z
D	I	N	T	Y
C	H	M	S	X
B	G	L	R	W
A	F	K	Q	V
