= Brahmagupta's formula =

Formula relating the area of a cyclic quadrilateral to its side lengths

In Euclidean geometry, Brahmagupta's formula, named after the 7th century Indian mathematician, is used to find the area of any convex cyclic quadrilateral (one that can be inscribed in a circle) given the lengths of the sides. Its generalized version, Bretschneider's formula, can be used with non-cyclic quadrilateral. Heron's formula can be thought as a special case of the Brahmagupta's formula for triangles.

== Formulation ==
Brahmagupta's formula gives the area K of a convex cyclic quadrilateral whose sides have lengths a, b, c, d as

$$K=\sqrt{(s-a)(s-b)(s-c)(s-d)}$$

where s, the semiperimeter, is defined to be

$$s=\frac{a+b+c+d}{2}.$$

This formula generalizes Heron's formula for the area of a triangle. A triangle may be regarded as a quadrilateral with one side of length zero. From this perspective, as d (or any one side) approaches zero, a cyclic quadrilateral converges into a cyclic triangle (all triangles are cyclic), and Brahmagupta's formula simplifies to Heron's formula.

If the semiperimeter is not used, Brahmagupta's formula is

$$K=\frac{1}{4}\sqrt{(-a+b+c+d)(a-b+c+d)(a+b-c+d)(a+b+c-d)}.$$

Another equivalent version is

$$K=\frac{\sqrt{(a^2+b^2+c^2+d^2)^2+8abcd-2(a^4+b^4+c^4+d^4)}}{4}\cdot$$

== Proof ==
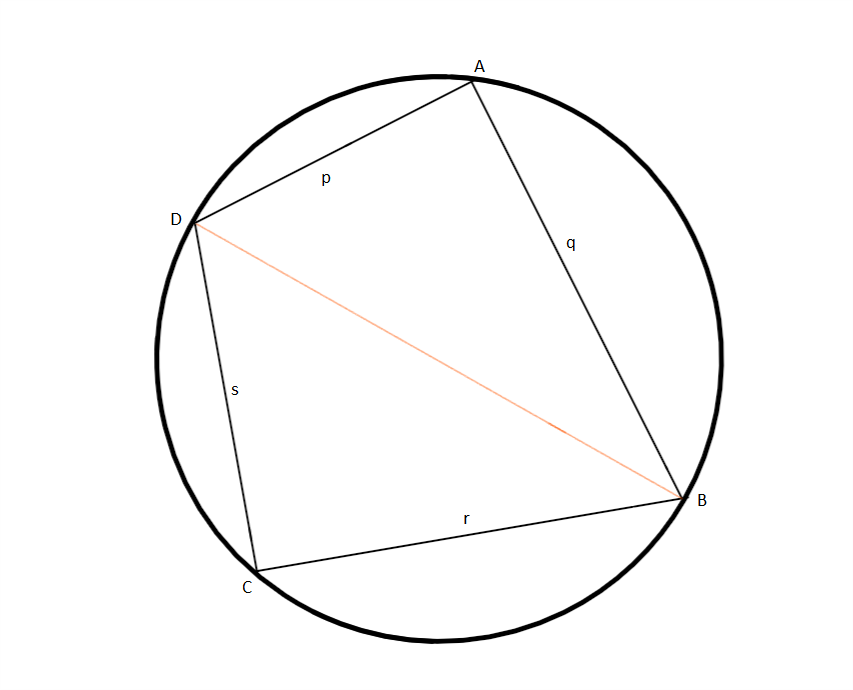
Diagram for reference

=== Trigonometric proof ===
Here the notations in the figure to the right are used. The area K of the convex cyclic quadrilateral equals the sum of the areas of △ADB and △BDC:

$$K = \frac{1}{2}pq\sin A + \frac{1}{2}rs\sin C.$$

But since □ABCD is a cyclic quadrilateral, ∠DAB = 180° − ∠DCB. Hence sin A = sin C. Therefore,

$$K = \frac{1}{2}pq\sin A + \frac{1}{2}rs\sin A$$

$$K^2 = \frac{1}{4} (pq + rs)^2 \sin^2 A$$

$$4K^2 = (pq + rs)^2 (1 - \cos^2 A) = (pq + rs)^2 - ((pq + rs)\cos A)^2$$

(using the trigonometric identity).

Solving for common side DB, in △ADB and △BDC, the law of cosines gives

$$p^2 + q^2 - 2pq\cos A = r^2 + s^2 - 2rs\cos C.$$

Substituting cos C = −cos A (since angles A and C are supplementary) and rearranging, we have

$$(pq + rs) \cos A = \frac{1}{2}(p^2 + q^2 - r^2 - s^2).$$

Substituting this in the equation for the area,

$$4K^2 = (pq + rs)^2 - \frac{1}{4}(p^2 + q^2 - r^2 - s^2)^2$$

$$16K^2 = 4(pq + rs)^2 - (p^2 + q^2 - r^2 - s^2)^2.$$

The right-hand side is of the form a^{2} − b^{2} = (a − b)(a + b) and hence can be written as

$$[2(pq + rs)) - p^2 - q^2 + r^2 +s^2][2(pq + rs) + p^2 + q^2 -r^2 - s^2]$$

which, upon rearranging the terms in the square brackets, yields

$$16K^2= [ (r+s)^2 - (p-q)^2 ][ (p+q)^2 - (r-s)^2 ]$$

that can be factored again into

$$16K^2=(q+r+s-p)(p+r+s-q)(p+q+s-r)(p+q+r-s).$$

Introducing the semiperimeter S = (p + q + r + s)/2 yields

$$16K^2 = 16(S-p)(S-q)(S-r)(S-s).$$

Taking the square root, we get

$$K = \sqrt{(S-p)(S-q)(S-r)(S-s)}.$$

=== Non-trigonometric proof ===
An alternative, non-trigonometric proof utilizes two applications of Heron's triangle area formula on similar triangles.

== Extension to non-cyclic quadrilaterals ==
In the case of non-cyclic quadrilaterals, Brahmagupta's formula can be extended by considering the measures of two opposite angles of the quadrilateral:

$$K=\sqrt{(s-a)(s-b)(s-c)(s-d)-abcd\cos^2\theta}$$

where θ is half the sum of any two opposite angles. (The choice of which pair of opposite angles is irrelevant: if the other two angles are taken, half their sum is 180° − θ. Since cos(180° − θ) = −cos θ, we have cos^{2}(180° − θ) = cos^{2} θ.) This more general formula is known as Bretschneider's formula.

It is a property of cyclic quadrilaterals (and ultimately of inscribed angles) that opposite angles of a quadrilateral sum to 180°. Consequently, in the case of an inscribed quadrilateral, θ is 90°, whence the term

$$abcd\cos^2\theta=abcd\cos^2 \left(90^\circ\right)=abcd\cdot0=0,$$

giving the basic form of Brahmagupta's formula. It follows from the latter equation that the area of a cyclic quadrilateral is the maximum possible area for any quadrilateral with the given side lengths.

A related formula, which was proved by Coolidge, also gives the area of a general convex quadrilateral. It is

$$K=\sqrt{(s-a)(s-b)(s-c)(s-d)-\textstyle{1\over4}(ac+bd+pq)(ac+bd-pq)}$$

where p and q are the lengths of the diagonals of the quadrilateral. In a cyclic quadrilateral, pq = ac + bd according to Ptolemy's theorem, and the formula of Coolidge reduces to Brahmagupta's formula.

== Related theorems ==
- Heron's formula for the area of a triangle is the special case obtained by taking d = 0.
- The relationship between the general and extended form of Brahmagupta's formula is similar to how the law of cosines extends the Pythagorean theorem.
- Increasingly complicated closed-form formulas exist for the area of general polygons on circles, as described by Maley et al.
