= Alderdice =

Alderdice is a Scottish surname. Notable people with the surname include:

- Alfred Alderdice (1918–1982), American actor with the stage name Tom Drake
- Craig Alderdice (born 1961), Australian rules footballer
- David K. Alderdice (born 1966), Northern Irish politician, mayor of Belfast
- Frederick C. Alderdice (1871–1936), Prime Minister of Newfoundland
- John Alderdice, Baron Alderdice (born 1955), Northern Irish politician
- Scott Alderdice, Australian writer and director

== See also ==
- Alderdice Peak
- Allardice
- Allardyce
