= Lexell's theorem =

Characterizes spherical triangles with fixed base and area

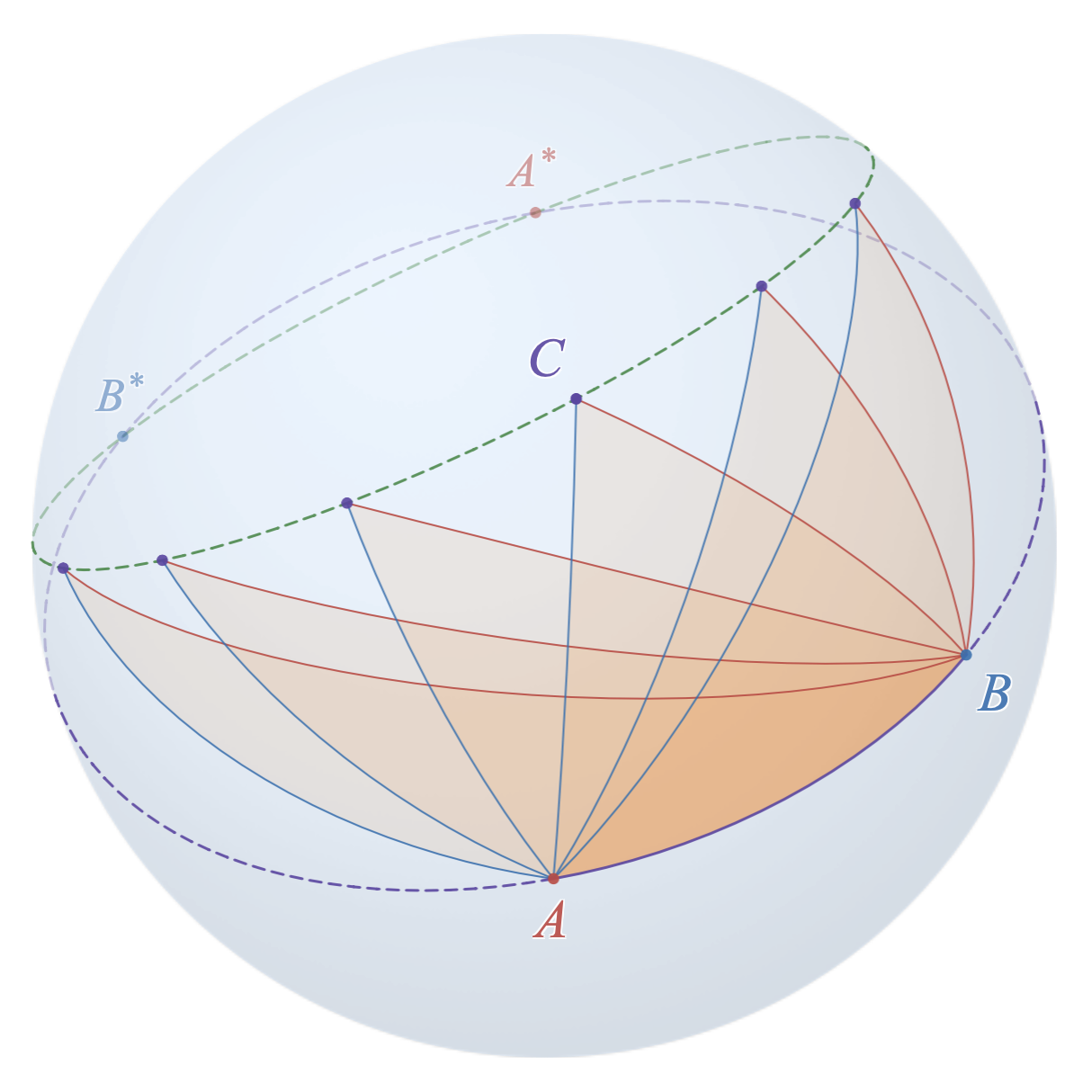
Orange triangles △ABC share a base AB and have the same area. The locus of their variable apex C is a small circle (dashed green) passing through the points antipodal to A and B.

In spherical geometry, Lexell's theorem holds that every spherical triangle with the same surface area on a fixed base has its apex on a small circle, called Lexell's circle or Lexell's locus, passing through each of the two points antipodal to the two base vertices.

A spherical triangle is a shape on a sphere consisting of three vertices (corner points) connected by three sides, each of which is part of a great circle, the analog on the sphere of a straight line in the plane (for example the equator and meridians of a globe); the spherical analog of planar circles, which curve relative to the surface, are called small circles (for example the circles of latitude other than the equator). Any of the sides of a spherical triangle can be considered the base, and the opposite vertex is the corresponding apex. Two points on a sphere are antipodal if they are diametrically opposite, as far apart as possible.

The theorem is named for Anders Johan Lexell, who presented a paper about it c. 1777 (published 1784) including both a trigonometric proof and a geometric one. Lexell's colleague Leonhard Euler wrote another pair of proofs in 1778 (published 1797), and a variety of proofs have been written since by Adrien-Marie Legendre (1800), Jakob Steiner (1827), Carl Friedrich Gauss (1841), Paul Serret (1855), and Joseph-Émile Barbier (1864), among others.

The theorem is the analog of propositions 37 and 39 in Book I of Euclid's Elements, which prove that every planar triangle with the same area on a fixed base has its apex on a straight line parallel to the base. An analogous theorem can also be proven for hyperbolic triangles, for which the apex lies on a hypercycle.

== Statement ==
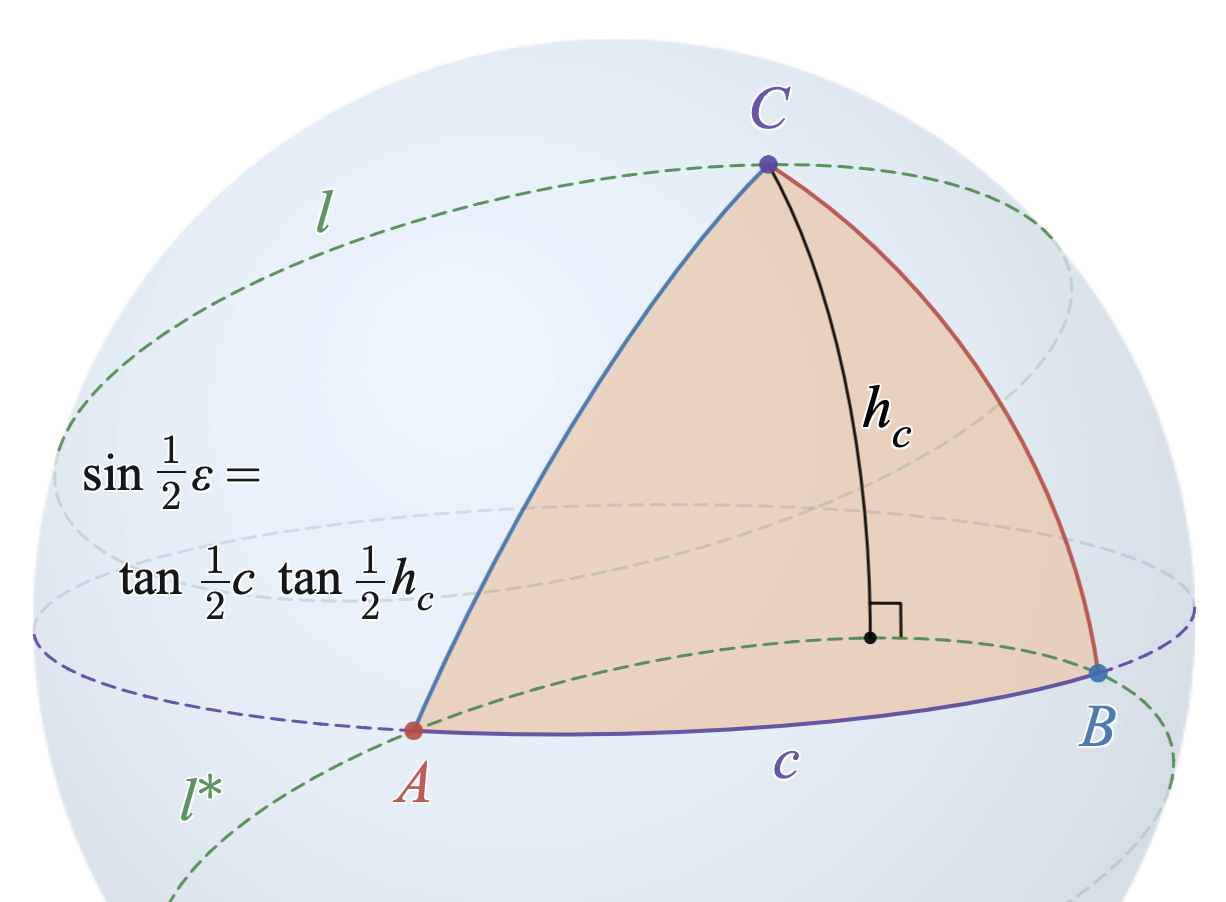
An area formula for spherical triangles analogous to the formula for planar triangles

Given a fixed base $AB,$ an arc of a great circle on a sphere, and two apex points $C$ and $X$ on the same side of great circle $AB,$ Lexell's theorem holds that the surface area of the spherical triangle $\triangle ABX$ is equal to that of $\triangle ABC$ if and only if $X$ lies on the small-circle arc $B^{*~\!\!} C A^*\!,$ where $A^{*~\!\!}$ and $B^{*~\!\!}$ are the points antipodal to $A$ and $B,$ respectively.

As one analog of the planar formula $\text{area} = \tfrac12 \, \text{base} \cdot \text{height}$ for the area of a triangle, the spherical excess $\varepsilon$ of spherical triangle $\triangle ABC$ can be computed in terms of the base $c$ (the angular length of arc $AB$) and "height" $h_c$ (the angular distance between the parallel small circles $A^{*~\!\!} B^{*~\!\!} C$ and $A B C^{*~\!\!}$):

$$\sin \tfrac12 \varepsilon = \tan \tfrac12 c \, \tan\tfrac12 h_c.$$

This formula is based on consideration of a sphere of radius $1$, on which arc length is called angle measure and surface area is called spherical excess or solid angle measure. The angle measure of a complete great circle is $2\pi$ radians, and the spherical excess of a hemisphere (half-sphere) is $2\pi$ steradians, where $\pi$ is the circle constant.

In the limit for triangles much smaller than the radius of the sphere, this reduces to the planar formula.

The small circles $A^{*~\!\!} B^{*~\!\!} C$ and $A B C^{*~\!\!}$ each intersect the great circle $AB$ at an angle of $\tfrac12 \varepsilon.$

== Proofs ==
There are several ways to prove Lexell's theorem, each illuminating a different aspect of the relationships involved.

=== Isosceles triangles ===
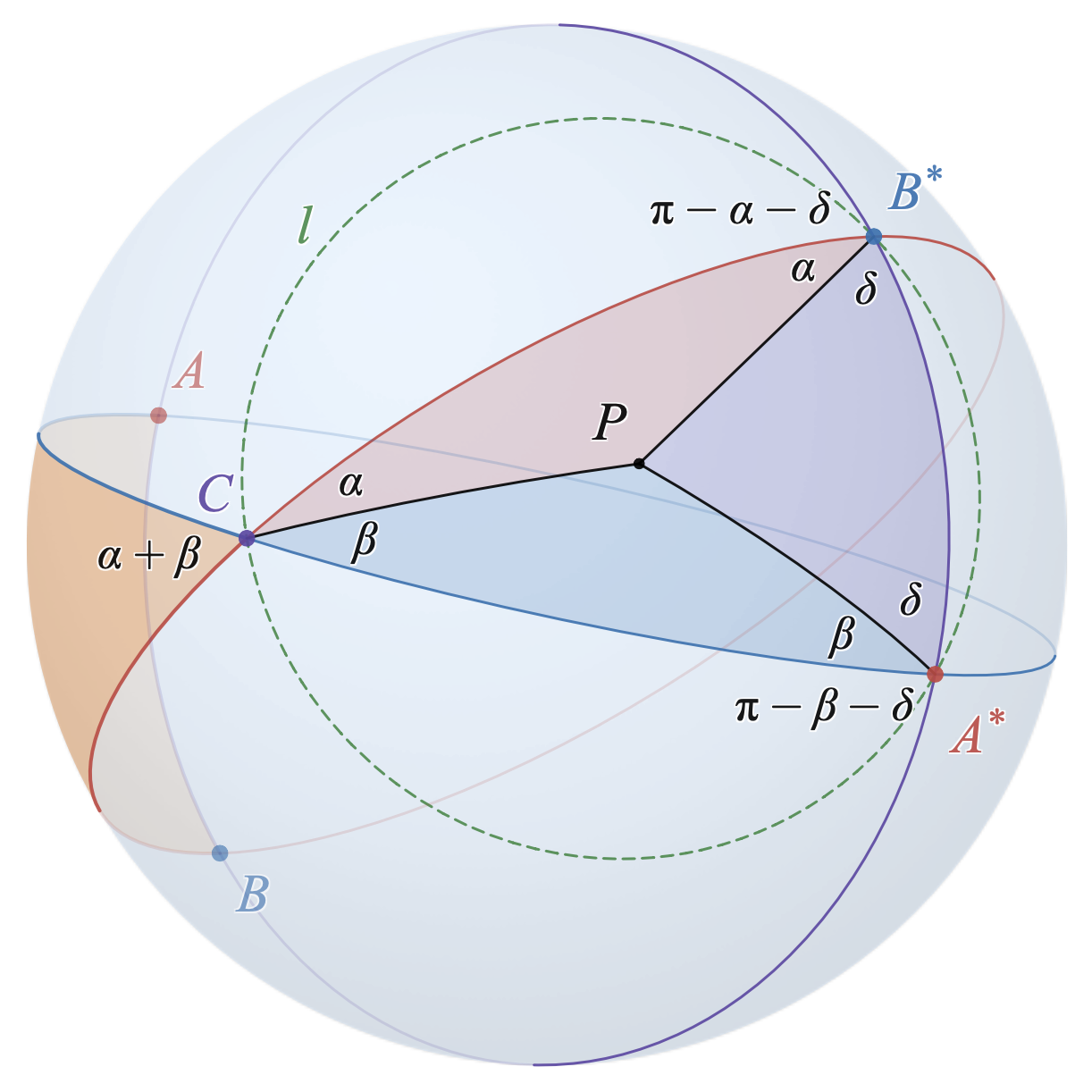
Lexell's proof by breaking the triangle △A^{∗}B^{∗}C into three isosceles triangles

The main idea in Lexell's c. 1777 geometric proof – also adopted by Eugène Catalan (1843), Robert Allardice (1883), Jacques Hadamard (1901), Antoine Gob (1922), and Hiroshi Maehara (1999) – is to split the triangle $\triangle A^{*~\!\!} B^{*~\!\!} C$ into three isosceles triangles with common apex at the circumcenter $P$ and then chase angles to find the spherical excess $\varepsilon$ of triangle $\triangle ABC.$ In the figure, points $A$ and $B$ are on the far side of the sphere so that we can clearly see their antipodal points and all of Lexell's circle $l.$

Let the base angles of the isosceles triangles $\triangle B^{*~\!\!} C P$ (shaded red in the figure), $\triangle CA^{*~\!\!} P$ (blue), and $\triangle A^{*~\!\!} B^{*~\!\!} P$ (purple) be respectively $\alpha,$ $\beta,$ and $\delta.$ (In some cases $P$ is outside $\triangle A^{*~\!\!} B^{*~\!\!} C$; then one of the quantities $\alpha, \beta, \delta$ will be negative.) We can compute the internal angles of $\triangle ABC$ (orange) in terms of these angles: $\angle A = \pi - \beta - \delta$ (the supplement of $\angle A^{*~\!\!}$) and likewise $\angle B = \pi - \alpha - \delta,$ and finally $\angle C = \alpha + \beta.$

By Girard's theorem the spherical excess of $\triangle ABC$ is

$$\begin{align}
\varepsilon
&= \angle A + \angle B + \angle C - \pi \\[3mu]
&= (\pi - \beta - \delta) + (\pi - \alpha - \delta) + (\alpha + \beta) - \pi \\[3mu]
&= \pi - 2\delta.
\end{align}$$

If base $AB$ is fixed, for any third vertex $C$ falling on the same arc of Lexell's circle, the point $P$ and therefore the quantity $\delta$ will not change, so the excess $\varepsilon$ of $\triangle ABC,$ which depends only on $\delta,$ will likewise be constant. And vice versa: if $\varepsilon$ remains constant when the point $C$ is changed, then so must $\delta$ be, and therefore $P$ must be fixed, so $C$ must remain on Lexell's circle.

=== Cyclic quadrilateral ===
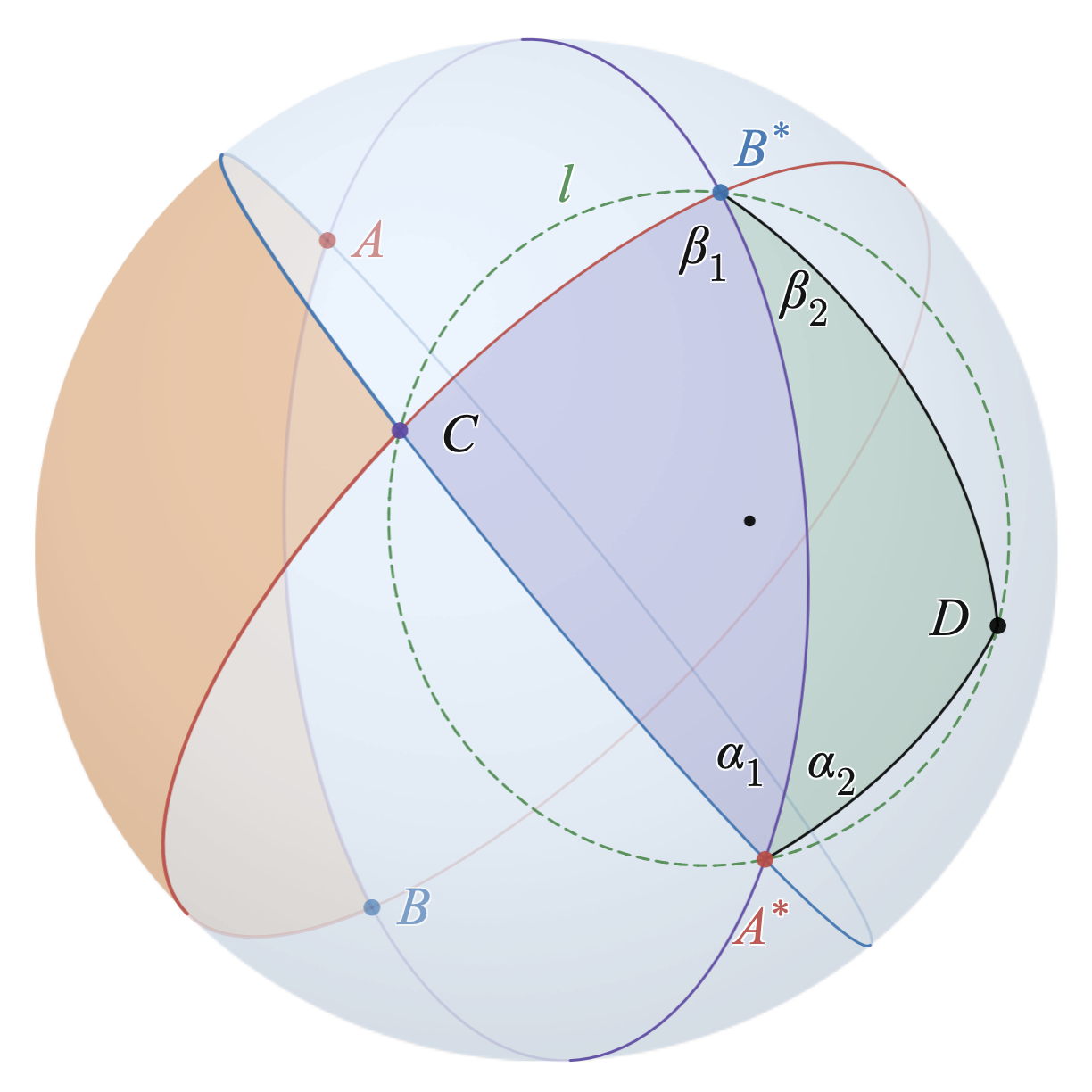
Steiner's proof by constructing a cyclic quadrilateral ◻A^{∗}DB^{∗}C inside Lexell's circle

Jakob Steiner (1827) wrote a proof in similar style to Lexell's, also using Girard's theorem, but demonstrating the angle invariants in the triangle $\triangle A^{*~\!\!} B^{*~\!\!} C$ by constructing a cyclic quadrilateral inside the Lexell circle, using the property that pairs of opposite angles in a spherical cyclic quadrilateral have the same sum.

Starting with a triangle $\triangle ABC$, let $l$ be the Lexell circle circumscribing $\triangle A^{*~\!\!} B^{*~\!\!} C,$ and let $D$ be another point on $l$ separated from $C$ by the great circle $B^{*~\!\!} A^*\!.$ Let $\alpha_1 = \angle C A^{*~\!\!} B^*\!,$ $\beta_1 = \angle A^{*~\!\!} B^{*~\!\!} C,$ $\alpha_2 = \angle B^{*~\!\!} A^{*~\!\!} D,$ $\beta_2 = \angle D A^{*~\!\!} B^*\!.$

Because the quadrilateral $\square A^{*~\!\!} D B^{*~\!\!} C$ is cyclic, the sum of each pair of its opposite angles is equal, $\angle C + \angle D = {}\!$$\alpha_1 + \alpha_2 + \beta_1 + \beta_2,$ or rearranged $\alpha_1 + \beta_1 - \angle C = {}\!$$\angle D - \alpha_2 - \beta_2.$

By Girard's theorem the spherical excess $\varepsilon$ of $\triangle ABC$ is

$$\begin{align}
\varepsilon
&= \angle A + \angle B + \angle C - \pi \\[3mu]
&= (\pi - \alpha_1) + (\pi - \beta_1) + \angle C - \pi \\[3mu]
&= \pi - (\alpha_1 + \beta_1 - \angle C) \\[3mu]
&= \pi - (\angle D - \alpha_2 - \beta_2).
\end{align}$$

The quantity $\angle D - \alpha_2 - \beta_2$ does not depend on the choice of $C,$ so is invariant when $C$ is moved to another point on the same arc of $l.$ Therefore $\varepsilon$ is also invariant.

Conversely, if $C$ is changed but $\varepsilon$ is invariant, then the opposite angles of the quadrilateral $\square A^{*~\!\!} D B^{*~\!\!} C$ will have the same sum, which implies $C$ lies on the small circle $A^{*~\!\!} D B^*\!.$

=== Spherical parallelograms ===
Euler in 1778 proved Lexell's theorem analogously to Euclid's proof of Elements I.35 and I.37, as did Victor-Amédée Lebesgue independently in 1855, using spherical parallelograms – spherical quadrilaterals with congruent opposite sides, which have parallel small circles passing through opposite pairs of adjacent vertices and are in many ways analogous to Euclidean parallelograms. There is one complication compared to Euclid's proof, however: The four sides of a spherical parallelogram are the great-circle arcs through the vertices rather than the parallel small circles. Euclid's proof does not need to account for the small lens-shaped regions sandwiched between the great and small circles, which vanish in the planar case.

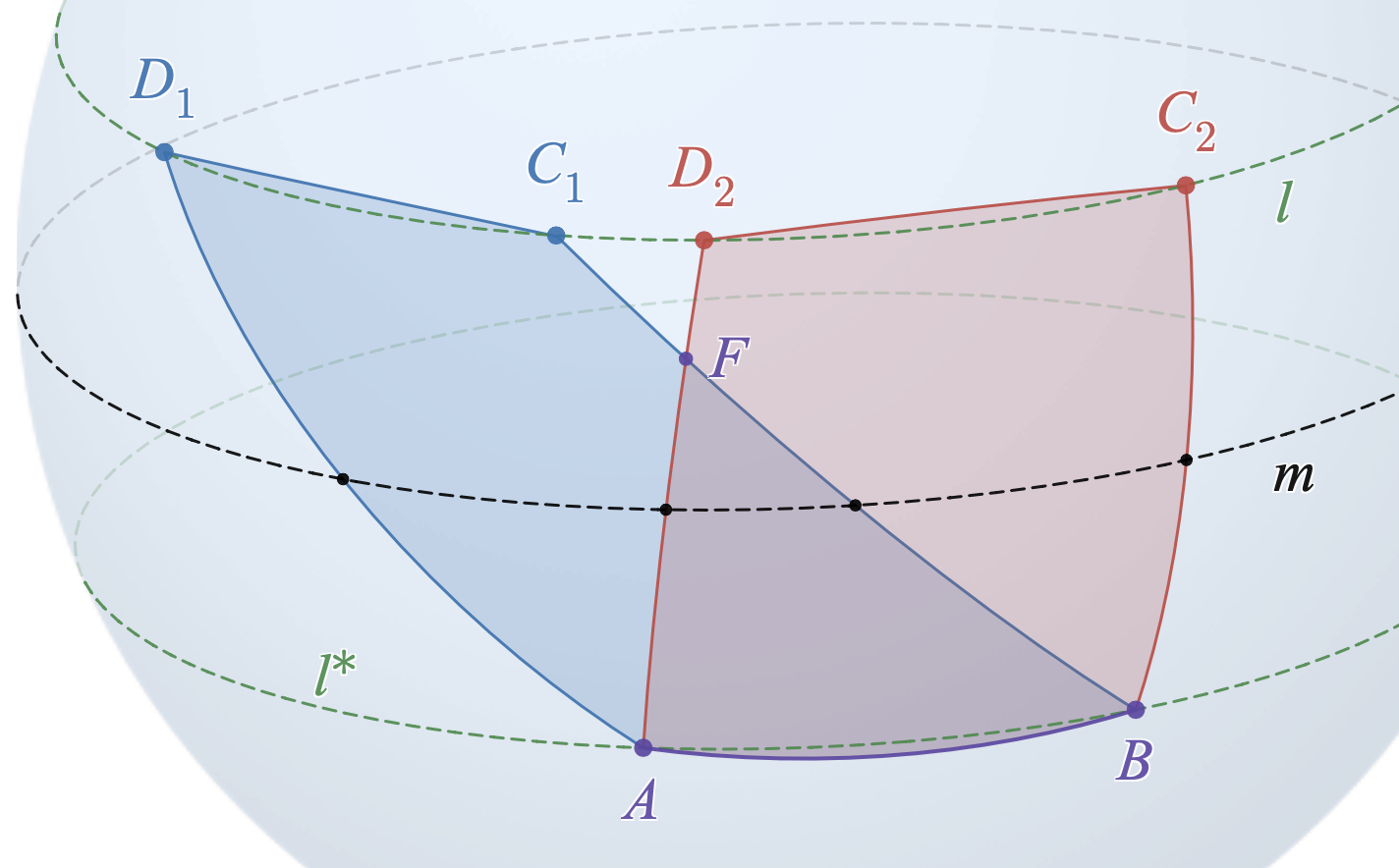
Lemma: Two spherical parallelograms with the same base and between the same parallels have equal area.

A lemma analogous to Elements I.35: two spherical parallelograms on the same base and between the same parallels have equal area.

Proof: Let $\square ABC_1D_1$ and $\square ABC_2D_2$ be spherical parallelograms with the great circle $m$ (the "midpoint circle") passing through the midpoints of sides $BC_1$ and $AD_1$ coinciding with the corresponding midpoint circle in $\square ABC_2D_2.$ Let $F$ be the intersection point between sides $AD_2$ and $BC_1.$ Because the midpoint circle $m$ is shared, the two top sides $C_1D_1$ and $C_2D_2$ lie on the same small circle $l$ parallel to $m$ and antipodal to a small circle $l^{*~\!\!}$ passing through $A$ and $B.$

Two arcs of $l$ are congruent, $D_1D_2 \cong C_1C_2,$ thus the two curvilinear triangles $\triangle BC_1C_2$ and $\triangle AD_1D_2,$ each bounded by $l$ on the top side, are congruent. Each parallelogram is formed from one of these curvilinear triangles added to the triangle $\triangle ABF$ and to one of the congruent lens-shaped regions between each top side and $l,$ with the curvilinear triangle $\triangle D_2C_1F$ cut away. Therefore the parallelograms have the same area. (As in Elements, the case where the parallelograms do not intersect on the sides is omitted, but can be proven by a similar argument.)

Proof of Lexell's theorem: Given two spherical triangles $\triangle ABC_1$ and $\triangle ABC_2$ each with its apex on the same small circle $l$ through points $A^{*~\!\!}$ and $B^*\!,$ construct new segments $C_1D_1$ and $C_2D_2$ congruent to $AB$ with vertices $D_1$ and $D_2$ on $l.$ The two quadrilaterals $\square ABC_1D_1$ and $\square ABC_2D_2$ are spherical parallelograms, each formed by pasting together the respective triangle and a congruent copy. By the lemma, the two parallelograms have the same area, so the original triangles must also have the same area.

Proof of the converse: If two spherical triangles have the same area and the apex of the second is assumed to not lie on the Lexell circle of the first, then the line through one side of the second triangle can be intersected with the Lexell circle to form a new triangle which has a different area from the second triangle but the same area as the first triangle, a contradiction. This argument is the same as that found in Elements I.39.

=== Saccheri quadrilateral ===
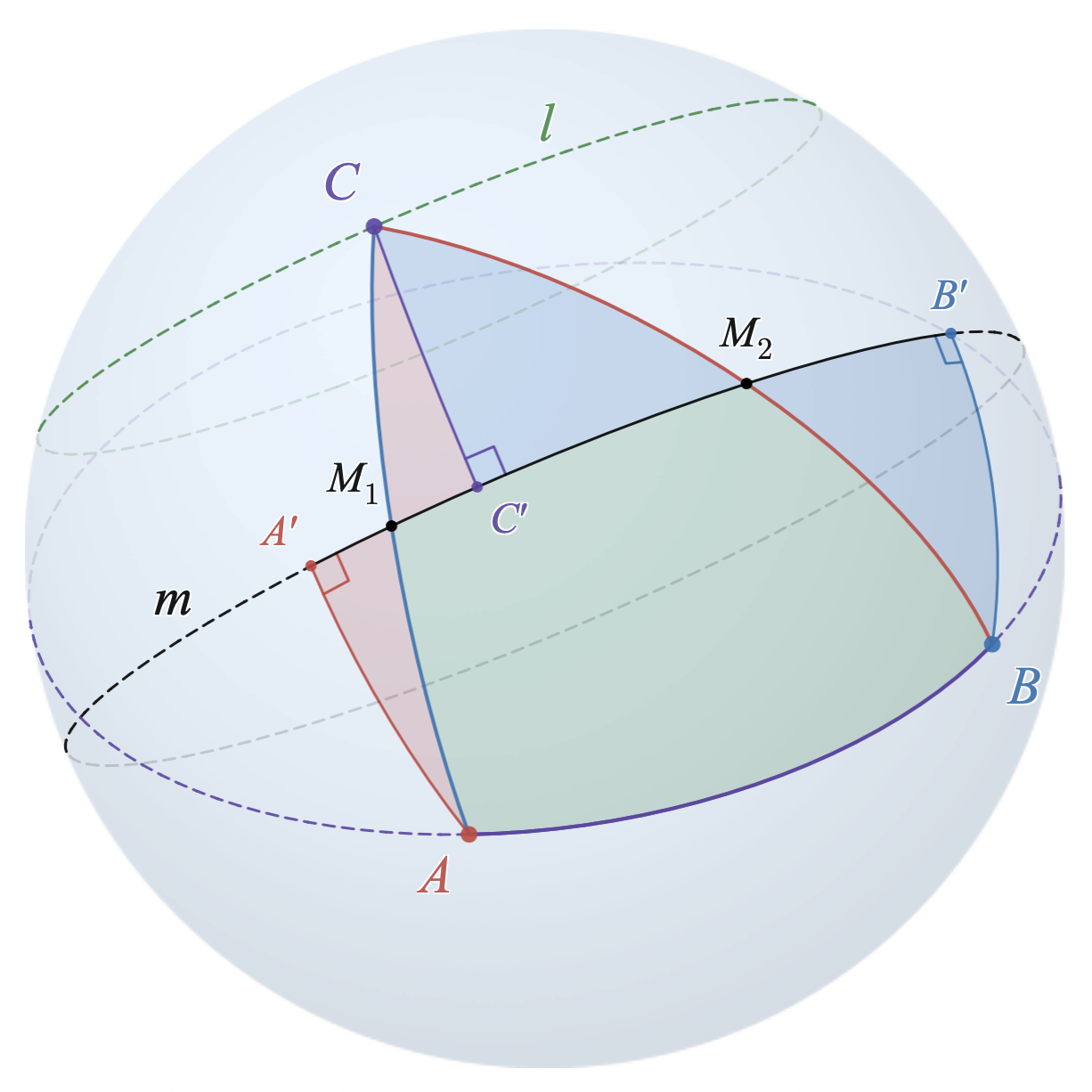
Gauss's proof using a Saccheri quadrilateral

Another proof using the midpoint circle which is more visually apparent in a single picture is due to Carl Friedrich Gauss (1841), who constructs the Saccheri quadrilateral (a quadrilateral with two adjacent right angles and two other equal angles) formed between the side of the triangle and its perpendicular projection onto the midpoint circle $m,$ which has the same area as the triangle.

Let $m$ be the great circle through the midpoints $M_1$ of $AC$ and $M_2$ of $BC,$ and let $A',$ $B',$ and $C'$ be the perpendicular projections of the triangle vertices onto $m.$ The resulting pair of right triangles $\triangle AA'M_1$ and $\triangle CC'M_1$ (shaded red) have equal angles at $M_1$ (vertical angles) and equal hypotenuses, so they are congruent; so are the triangles $\triangle BB'M_2$ and $\triangle CC'M_2$ (blue). Therefore, the area of triangle $\triangle ABC$ is equal to the area of Saccheri quadrilateral $\square ABB'A',$ as each consists of one red triangle, one blue triangle, and the green quadrilateral $\square ABM_2M_1$ pasted together. (If $C'$ falls outside the arc $A'B',$ then either the red or blue triangles will have negative signed area.) Because the great circle $m,$ and therefore the quadrilateral $\square ABB'A',$ is the same for any choice of $C$ lying on the Lexell circle $l,$ the area of the corresponding triangle $\triangle ABC$ is constant.

=== Stereographic projection ===
The stereographic projection maps the sphere to the plane. A designated great circle is mapped onto the primitive circle in the plane, and its poles are mapped to the origin (center of the primitive circle) and the point at infinity, respectively. Every circle on the sphere is mapped to a circle or straight line in the plane, with straight lines representing circles through the second pole. The stereographic projection is conformal, meaning it preserves angles.

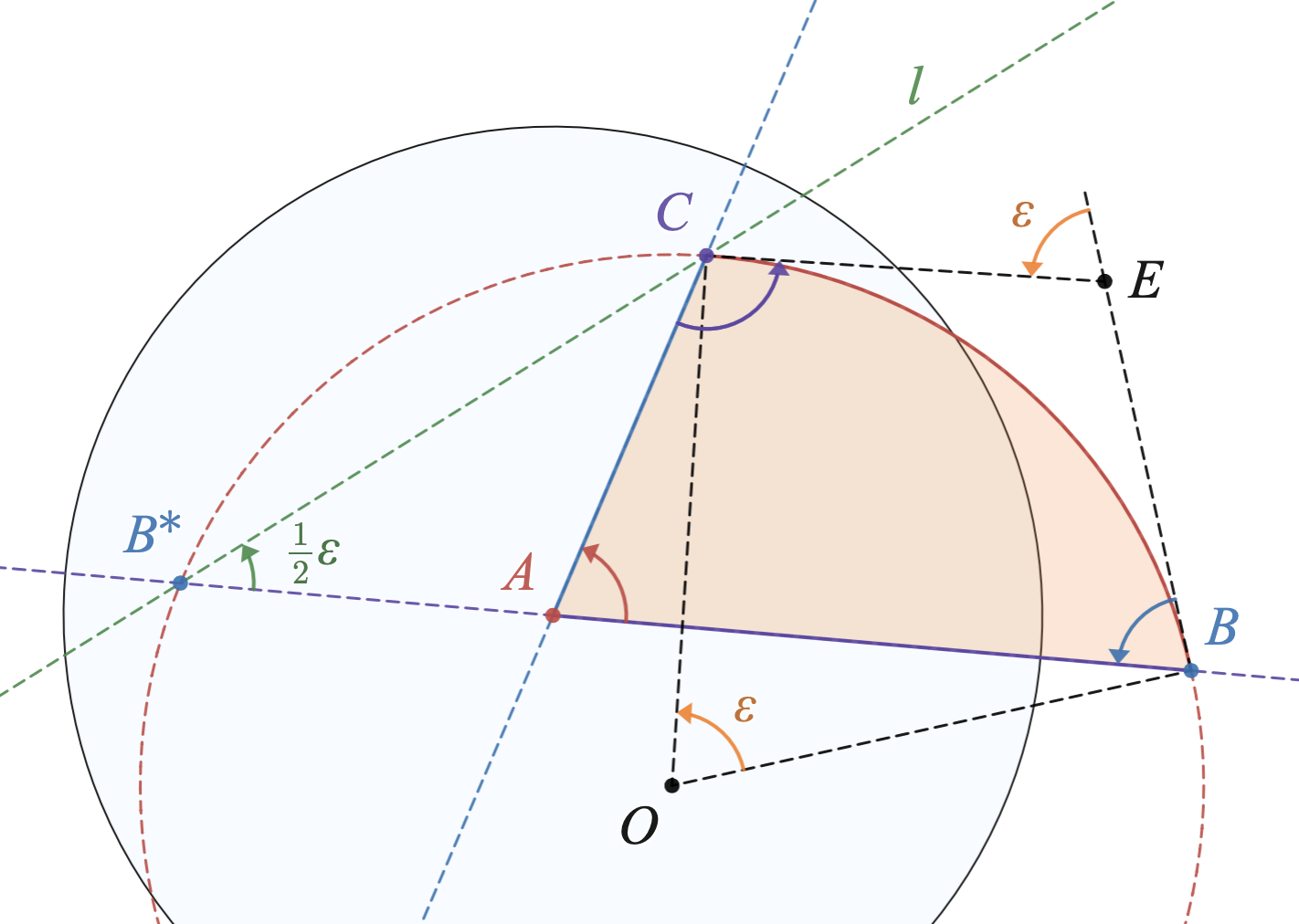
Paul Serret's proof by stereographic projection with A projected to the origin

To prove relationships about a general spherical triangle $\triangle ABC,$ without loss of generality vertex $A$ can be taken as the point which projects to the origin. The sides of the spherical triangle then project to two straight segments and a circular arc. If the tangent lines to the circular side at the other two vertices intersect at point $E,$ a planar straight-sided quadrilateral $\square ABEC$ can be formed whose external angle at $E$ is the spherical excess $\varepsilon = \angle A + \angle B + \angle C - \pi$ of the spherical triangle. This is sometimes called the Cesàro method of spherical trigonometry, after crystallographer Giuseppe Cesàro who popularized it in two 1905 papers.

Paul Serret (in 1855, a half century before Cesàro), and independently Aleksander Simonič (2019), used Cesàro's method to prove Lexell's theorem. Let $O$ be the center in the plane of the circular arc to which side $BC$ projects. Then planar quadrilateral $\square OBEC$ is a right kite, so the central angle $\angle BOC$ is equal to the external angle at $E,$ the triangle's spherical excess $\varepsilon.$ Planar angle $\angle BB^{*~\!\!}C$ is an inscribed angle subtending the same arc, so by the inscribed angle theorem has measure $\tfrac12\varepsilon.$ This relationship is preserved for any choice of $C$; therefore, the spherical excess of the triangle is constant whenever $C$ remains on the Lexell circle $l,$ which projects to a line through $B^{*~\!\!}$ in the plane. (If the area of the triangle is greater than a half-hemisphere, a similar argument can be made, but the point $E$ is no longer internal to the angle $\angle BOC.$)

=== Perimeter of the polar triangle ===
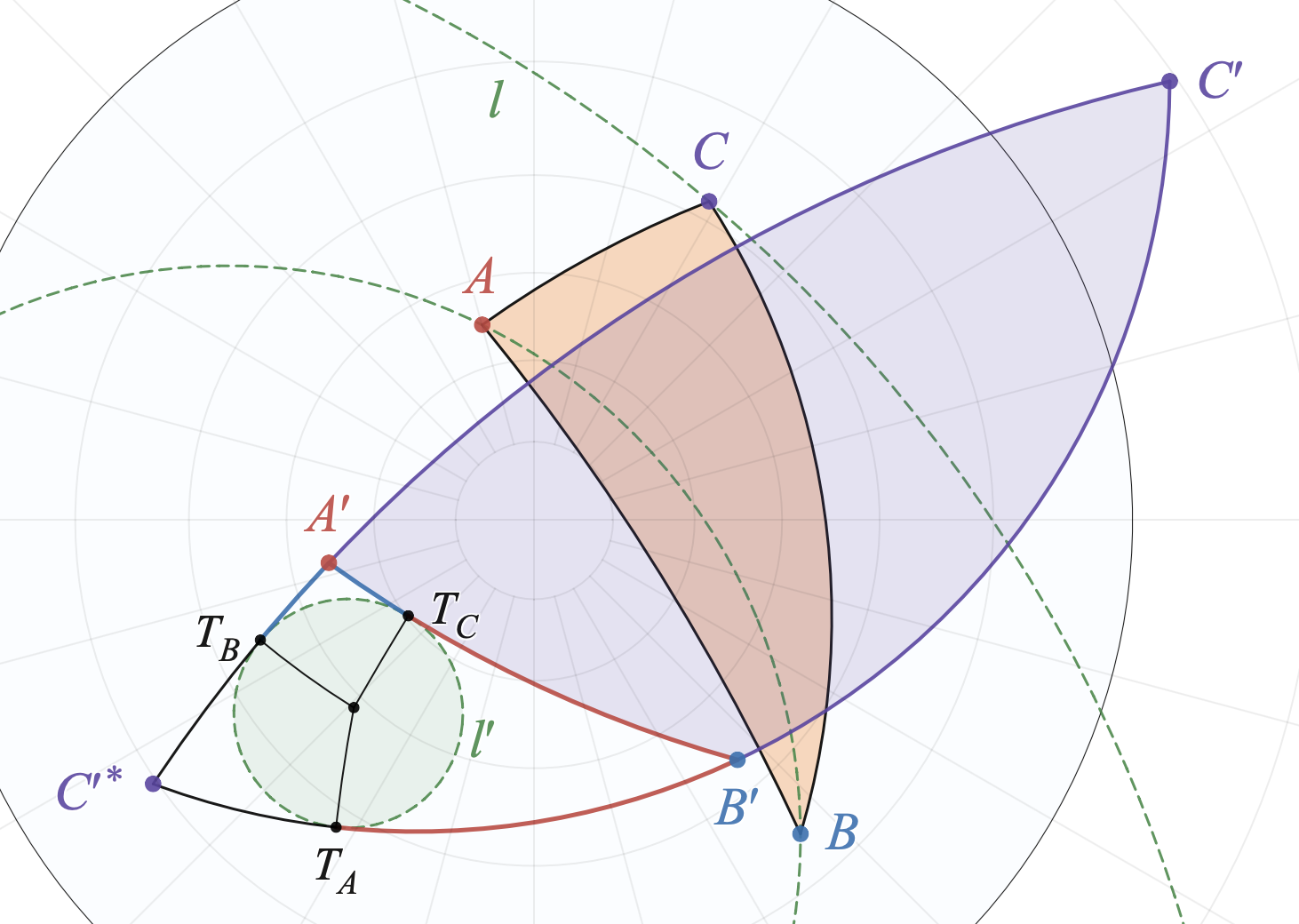
Barbier's proof using the perimeter of a polar triangle △A′B′C′, pictured in stereographic projection

Every spherical triangle has a dual, its polar triangle; if triangle $\triangle A'B'C'$ (shaded purple) is the polar triangle of $\triangle ABC$ (shaded orange) then the vertices $A'\!, B'\!, C'$ are the poles of the respective sides $BC, CA, AB,$ and vice versa, the vertices $A, B, C$ are the poles of the sides $B'C'\!, C'A'\!, A'B'\!.$ The polar duality exchanges the sides (central angles) and external angles (dihedral angles) between the two triangles.

Because each side of the dual triangle is the supplement of an internal angle of the original triangle, the spherical excess $\varepsilon$ of $\triangle ABC$ is a function of the perimeter $p'$ of the dual triangle $\triangle A'B'C'$:

$$\begin{align}
\varepsilon
&= \angle A + \angle B + \angle C - \pi \\[3mu]
&= \bigl(\pi - |B'C'|\bigr) + \bigl(\pi - |C'A'|\bigr) + \bigl(\pi - |A'B'|\bigr) - \pi  \\[3mu]
&= 2\pi - p',
\end{align}$$

where the notation $|PQ|$ means the angular length of the great-circle arc $PQ.$

In 1854 Joseph-Émile Barbier – and independently László Fejes Tóth (1953) – used the polar triangle in his proof of Lexell's theorem, which is essentially dual to the proof by isosceles triangles above, noting that under polar duality the Lexell circle $l$ circumscribing $\triangle A^{*~\!\!} B^{*~\!\!} C$ becomes an excircle $l'$ of $\triangle A'B'C'$ (incircle of a colunar triangle) externally tangent to side $A'B'.$

If vertex $C$ is moved along $l,$ the side $A'B'$ changes but always remains tangent to the same circle $l'.$ Because the arcs from each vertex to either adjacent touch point of an incircle or excircle are congruent, $A'T_B \cong A'T_C$ (blue segments) and $B'T_A \cong B'T_C$ (red segments), the perimeter $p'$ is

$$\begin{align}
p' &= |A'B'| + |B'C'| + |C'A'| \\[3mu]
&= \bigl(|A'T_C| + |B'T_C|\bigr) + |C'B'| + |C'A'| \\[3mu]
&= \bigl(|C'A'| + |A'T_B|\bigr) + \bigl(|C'B'| + |B'T_A|\bigr)  \\[3mu]
&= |C'T_B| + |C'T_A|,
\end{align}$$

which remains constant, depending only on the circle $l'$ but not on the changing side $A'B'.$ Conversely, if the point $C$ moves off of $l,$ the associated excircle $l'$ will change in size, moving the points $T_A$ and $T_B$ both toward or both away from $C'^{*~\!\!}$ and changing the perimeter $p'$ of $\triangle A'B'C'\!$ and thus changing $\varepsilon.$

The locus of points $C$ for which $\varepsilon$ is constant is therefore $l.$

=== Trigonometric proofs ===
Both Lexell (c. 1777) and Euler (1778) included trigonometric proofs in their papers, and several later mathematicians have presented trigonometric proofs, including Adrien-Marie Legendre (1800), Louis Puissant (1842), Ignace-Louis-Alfred Le Cointe (1858), and Joseph-Alfred Serret (1862). Such proofs start from known triangle relations such as the spherical law of cosines or a formula for spherical excess, and then proceed by algebraic manipulation of trigonometric identities.

== Opposite arcs of Lexell's circle ==
The sphere is separated into two hemispheres by the great circle $AB,$ and any Lexell circle through $A^{*~\!\!}$ and $B^{*~\!\!}$ is separated into two arcs, one in each hemisphere. If the point $X$ is on the opposite arc from $C,$ then the areas of $\triangle ABC$ and $\triangle ABX$ will generally differ. However, if spherical surface area is interpreted to be signed, with sign determined by boundary orientation, then the areas of triangle $\triangle ABC$ and $\triangle ABX$ have opposite signs and differ by the area of a hemisphere.

Lexell suggested a more general framing. Given two distinct non-antipodal points $A$ and $B,$ there are two great-circle arcs joining them: one shorter than a semicircle and the other longer. Given a triple $A,B, C$ of points, typically $\triangle ABC$ is interpreted to mean the area enclosed by the three shorter arcs joining each pair. However, if we allow choice of arc for each pair, then 8 distinct generalized spherical triangles can be made, some with self intersections, of which four might be considered to have the same base $AB.$

The eight generalized spherical triangles for vertices A, B, C, shown in stereographic projection, with orange and purple shading representing areas of opposite signs

These eight triangles do not all have the same surface area, but if area is interpreted to be signed, with sign determined by boundary orientation, then those which differ differ by the area of a hemisphere.

In this context, given four distinct, non-antipodal points $A,$ $B,$ $C,$ and $X$ on a sphere, Lexell's theorem holds that the signed surface area of any generalized triangle $\triangle ABC$ differs from that of any generalized triangle $\triangle ABX$ by a whole number of hemispheres if and only if $A^*\!,$ $B^*\!,$ $C,$ and $X$ are concyclic.

== Special cases ==
=== Lunar degeneracy ===
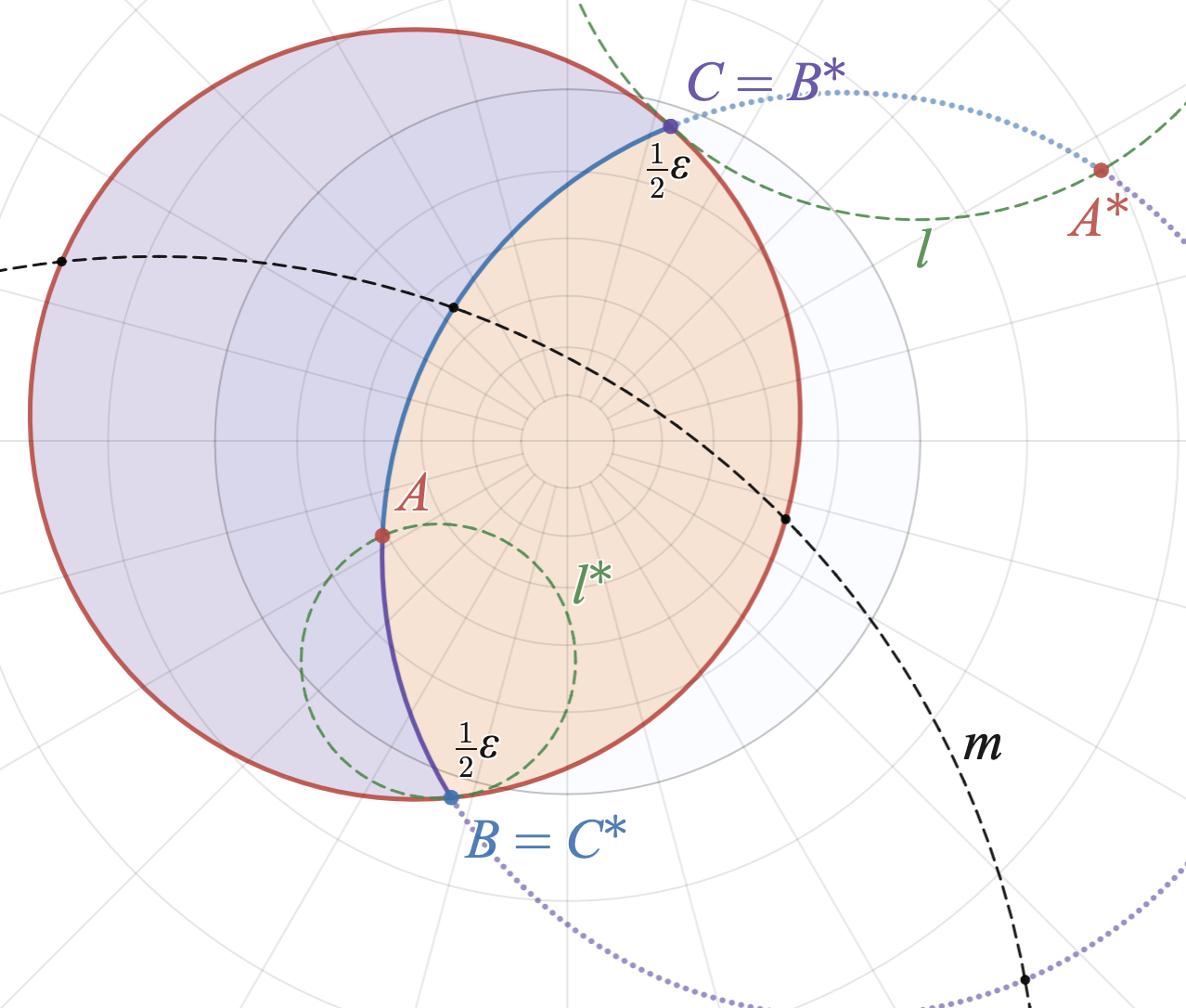
In the limit as C → B^{∗} along Lexell's circle l the triangle △ABC degenerates to the lune (shaded orange or purple) with its side tangent to l (here pictured in stereographic projection).

As the apex $C$ approaches either of the points antipodal to the base vertices – say $B^{*~\!\!}$ – along Lexell's circle $l,$ in the limit the triangle degenerates to a lune tangent to $l$ at $B^{*~\!\!}$ and tangent to the antipodal small circle $l^{*~\!\!}$ at $B,$ and having the same excess $\varepsilon$ as any of the triangles with apex on the same arc of $l.$ As a degenerate triangle, it has a straight angle at $A$ (i.e. $\angle A = \pi,$ a half turn) and equal angles $B = B^{*~\!\!} = \tfrac12\varepsilon.$

As $C$ approaches $B^{*~\!\!}$ from the opposite direction (along the other arc of Lexell's circle), in the limit the triangle degenerates to the co-hemispherical lune tangent to the Lexell circle at $B^{*~\!\!}$ with the opposite orientation and angles $\angle B = \angle B^\star = \pi - \tfrac12\varepsilon.$

=== Half-hemisphere area ===
The area of a spherical triangle is equal to half a hemisphere (excess $\varepsilon = \pi$) if and only if the Lexell circle $A^{*~\!\!}B^{*~\!\!}C$ is orthogonal to the great circle $AB,$ that is if arc $A^{*~\!\!}B^{*~\!\!}$ is a diameter of circle $A^{*~\!\!}B^{*~\!\!}C$ and arc $AB$ is a diameter of $ABC^*\!.$

In this case, letting $D$ be the point diametrically opposed to $C$ on the Lexell circle $A^{*~\!\!}B^{*~\!\!}C$ then the four triangles $\triangle ABC,$ $\triangle BAD,$ $\triangle CDA,$ and $\triangle DCB$ are congruent, and together form a spherical disphenoid $ABCD$ (the central projection of a disphenoid onto a concentric sphere). The eight points $AA^{*~\!\!}BB^{*~\!\!}CC^{*~\!\!}DD^{*~\!\!}$ are the vertices of a rectangular cuboid.

== Related concepts and results ==
=== Spherical parallelogram ===
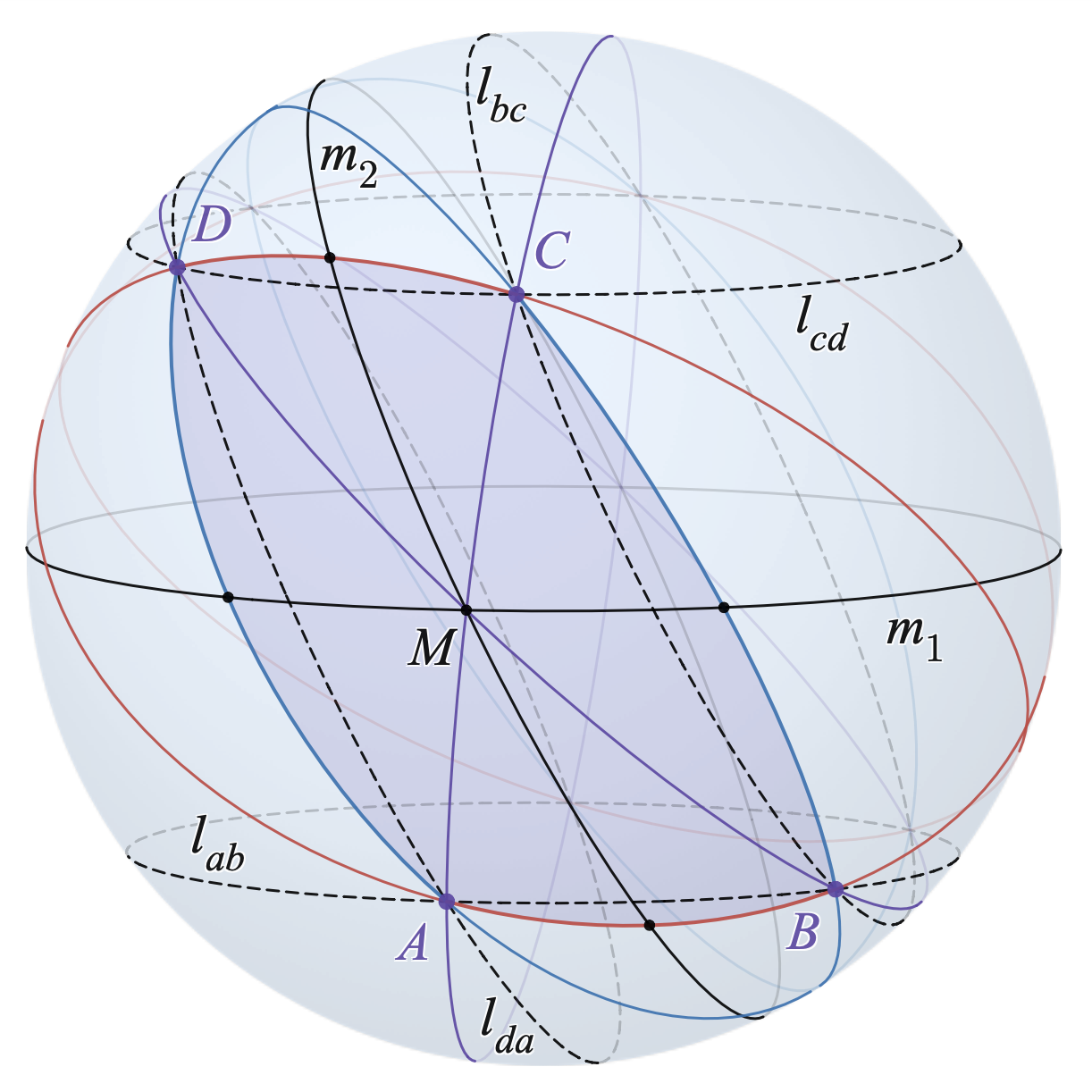
A spherical parallelogram, showing great circles with solid lines and small circles with dashed lines

A spherical parallelogram is a spherical quadrilateral $\square ABCD$ whose opposite sides and opposite angles are congruent ($AB \cong CD,$ $BC \cong DA,$ $\angle A = \angle C,$ $\angle B = \angle D$). It is in many ways analogous to a planar parallelogram. The two diagonals $AC$ and $BD$ bisect each-other and the figure has 2-fold rotational symmetry about the intersection point (so the diagonals each split the parallelogram into two congruent spherical triangles, $\triangle ABC \cong \triangle CDA$ and $\triangle ABD \cong \triangle CDB$); if the midpoints of either pair of opposite sides are connected by a great circle $m$, the four vertices fall on two parallel small circles equidistant from it. More specifically, any vertex (say $D$) of the spherical parallelogram lies at the intersection of the two Lexell circles ($l_{cd}$ and $l_{da}$) passing through one of the adjacent vertices and the points antipodal to the other two vertices.

As with spherical triangles, spherical parallelograms with the same base and the apex vertices lying on the same Lexell circle have the same area; see § Spherical parallelograms above. Starting from any spherical triangle, a second congruent triangle can be formed via a (spherical) point reflection across the midpoint of any side. When combined, these two triangles form a spherical parallelogram with twice the area of the original triangle.

=== Sorlin's theorem (polar dual) ===
The polar dual to Lexell's theorem, sometimes called Sorlin's theorem after A. N. J. Sorlin who first proved it trigonometrically in 1825, holds that for a spherical trilateral $\triangle abc$ with sides on fixed great circles $a, b$ (thus fixing the angle between them) and a fixed perimeter $p = |a| + |b| + |c|$ (where $|a|$ means the length of the triangle side $a$), the envelope of the third side $c$ is a small circle internally tangent to $a, b$ and externally tangent to $c,$ the excircle to trilateral $\triangle abc.$ Joseph-Émile Barbier later wrote a geometrical proof (1864) which he used to prove Lexell's theorem, by duality; see § Perimeter of the polar triangle above.

This result also applies in Euclidean and hyperbolic geometry: Barbier's geometrical argument can be transplanted directly to the Euclidean or hyperbolic plane.

=== Foliation of the sphere ===
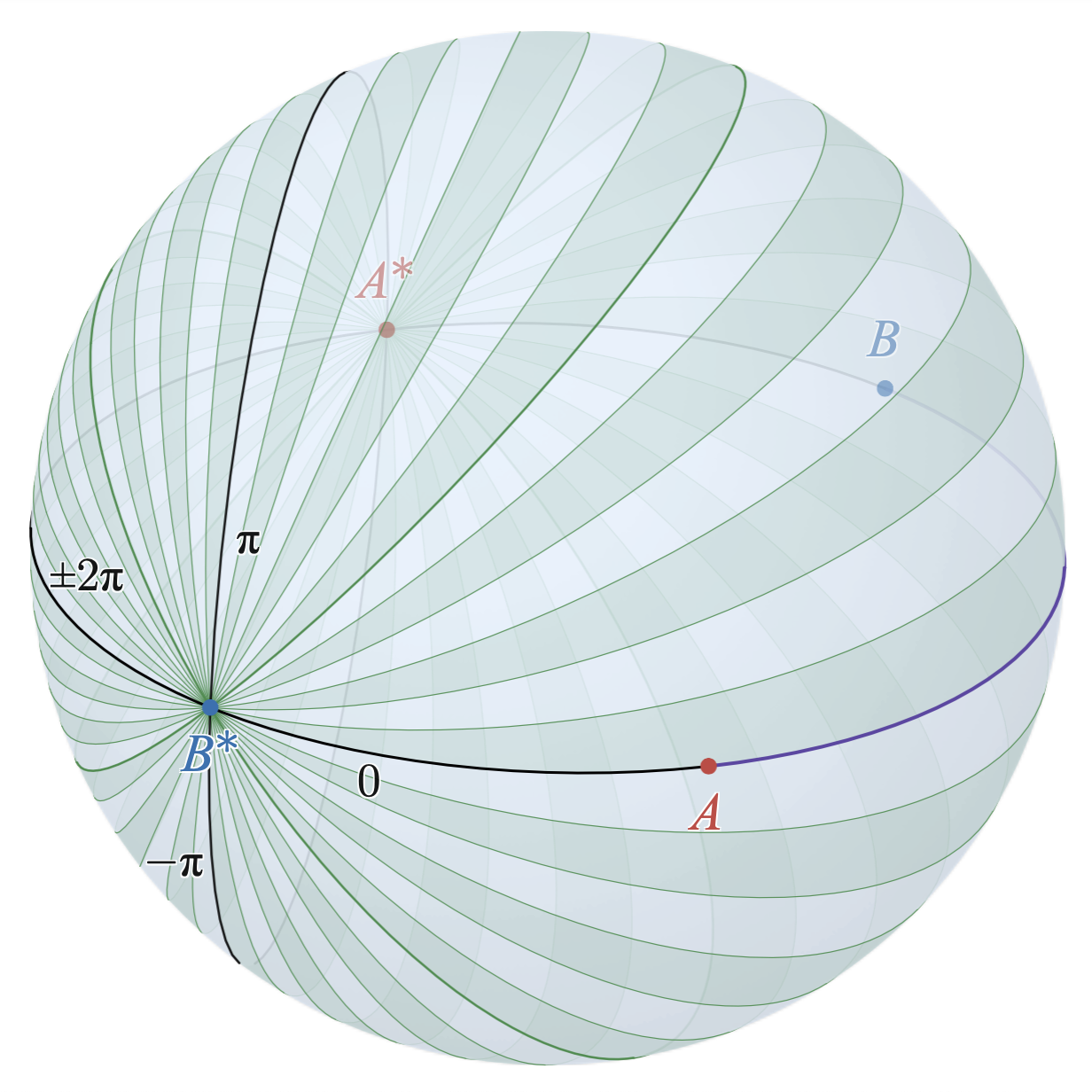
A foliation of the sphere by Lexell's loci

Lexell's loci for any base $AB$ make a foliation of the sphere (decomposition into one-dimensional leaves), with two singularities at the points $A^{*~\!\!}$ and $B^{*~\!\!}$. These loci are arcs of small circles with endpoints at $A^{*~\!\!}$ and $B^*\!,$ on which any intermediate point $C$ is the apex of a triangle $ABC$ of a fixed signed area. That area is twice the signed angle between the Lexell circle and the great circle $ABA^{*~\!\!}B^{*~\!\!}$ at either of the points $A^{*~\!\!}$ or $B^{*~\!\!}$; see § Lunar degeneracy above. In the figure, the Lexell circles are in green, except for those whose triangles' area is a multiple of a half hemisphere, which are black, with area labeled; see § Half-hemisphere area above.

These Lexell circles through $A^{*~\!\!}$ and $B^{*~\!\!}$ are the spherical analog of the family of Apollonian circles through two points in the plane.

=== Maximizing spherical triangle area subject to constraints ===
In 1784 Nicolas Fuss posed and solved the problem of finding the triangle $\triangle ABC$ of maximal area on a given base $AB$ with its apex $C$ on a given great circle $g.$ Fuss used an argument involving infinitesimal variation of $C,$ but the solution is also a straightforward corollary of Lexell's theorem: the Lexell circle $A^{*~\!\!}B^{*~\!\!}C$ through the apex must be tangent to $g$ at $C.$

If $g$ crosses the great circle through $AB$ at a point $P$, then by the spherical analog of the tangent–secant theorem, the angular distance $PC$ to the desired point of tangency satisfies

$$\tan^2 \tfrac12|PC| = \tan \tfrac12 |PA^*|\,\tan \tfrac12 |PB^*|,$$

from which we can explicitly construct the point $C$ on $g$ such that $\triangle ABC$ has maximum area.

In 1786 Theodor von Schubert posed and solved the problem of finding the spherical triangles of maximum and minimum area of a given base and "altitude" (the spherical length of a perpendicular dropped from the apex to the great circle containing the base); spherical triangles with constant altitude have their apex on a common small circle (the "altitude circle") parallel to the great circle containing the base. Schubert solved this problem by a calculus-based trigonometric approach to show that the triangle of minimal area has its apex at the nearest intersection of the altitude circle and the perpendicular bisector of the base, and the triangle of maximal area has its apex at the far intersection. However, this theorem is also a straightforward corollary of Lexell's theorem: the Lexell circles through the points antipodal to the base vertices representing the smallest and largest triangle areas are those tangent to the altitude circle. In 2019 Vincent Alberge and Elena Frenkel solved the analogous problem in the hyperbolic plane.

=== Steiner's theorem on area bisectors ===
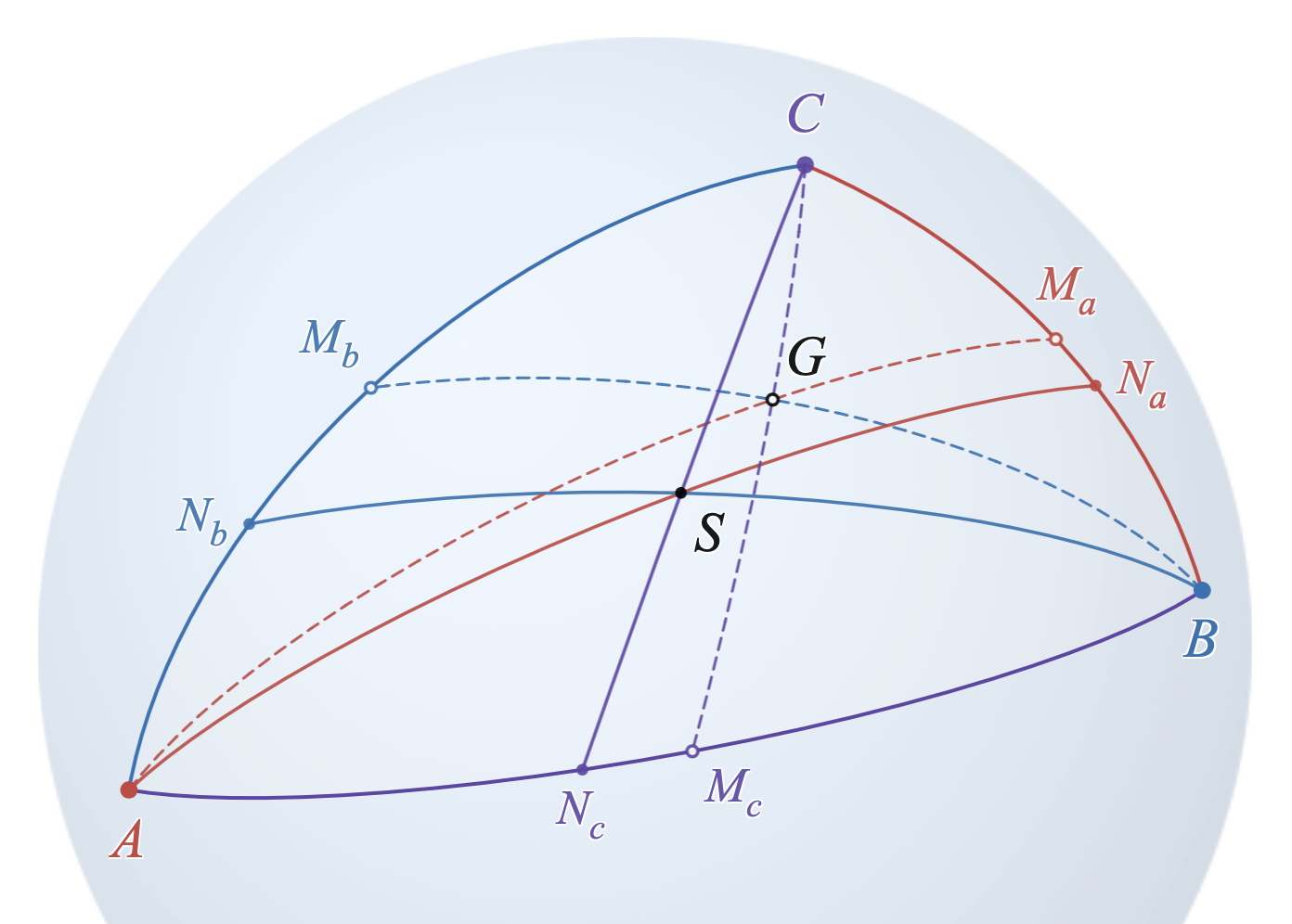
Steiner's theorem: the "equalizers" (area-bisecting arcs through each vertex) of a spherical triangle all intersect in a point S. (This is distinct from the intersection of the medians G.)

In the Euclidean plane, a median of a triangle is the line segment connecting a vertex to the midpoint of the opposite side. The three medians of a triangle all intersect at its centroid. Each median bisects the triangle's area.

On the sphere, a median of a triangle can also be defined as the great-circle arc connecting a vertex to the midpoint of the opposite side. The three medians all intersect at a point, the central projection onto the sphere of the triangle's extrinsic centroid – that is, centroid of the flat triangle containing the three points if the sphere is embedded in 3-dimensional Euclidean space. However, on the sphere the great-circle arc through one vertex and a point on the opposite side which bisects the triangle's area is, in general, distinct from the corresponding median.

Jakob Steiner used Lexell's theorem to prove that these three area-bisecting arcs (which he called "equalizers") all intersect in a point, one possible alternative analog of the planar centroid in spherical geometry. (A different spherical analog of the centroid is the apex of three triangles of equal area whose bases are the sides of the original triangle, the point with $\bigl(\tfrac13,\tfrac13,\tfrac13\bigr)$ as its spherical area coordinates.)

=== Spherical area coordinates ===
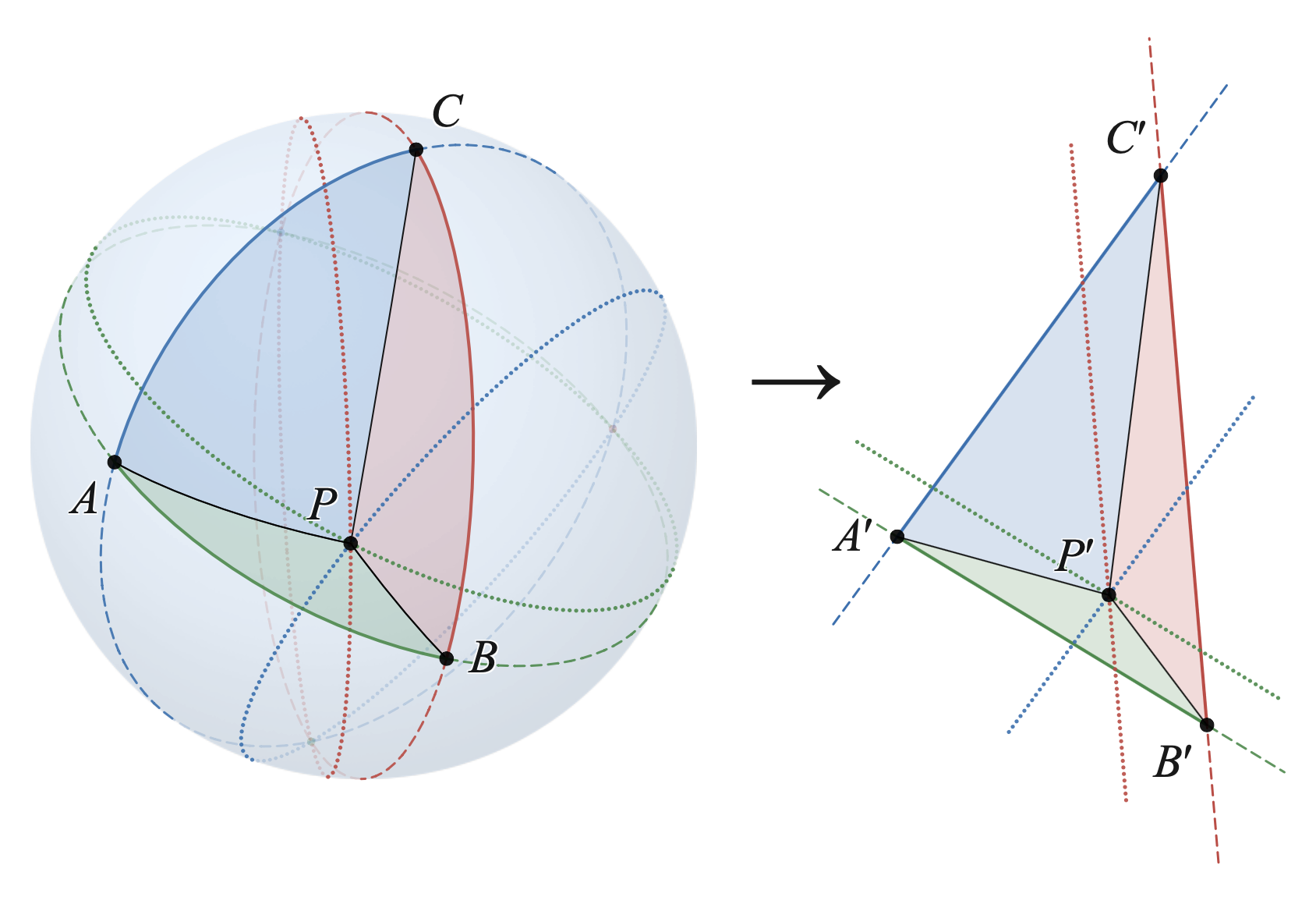
Mapping from spherical area coordinates to barycentric coordinates in the plane

The barycentric coordinate system for points relative to a given triangle in affine space does not have a perfect analogy in spherical geometry; there is no single spherical coordinate system sharing all of its properties. One partial analogy is spherical area coordinates for a point $P$ relative to a given spherical triangle $\triangle ABC,$

$$\left(
\frac{\varepsilon_{PBC}}{\varepsilon_{ABC}},
\frac{\varepsilon_{APC}}{\varepsilon_{ABC}},
\frac{\varepsilon_{ABP}}{\varepsilon_{ABC}}
\right),$$

where each quantity $\varepsilon_{QRS}$ is the signed spherical excess of the corresponding spherical triangle $\triangle QRS.$ These coordinates sum to $1,$ and using the same definition in the plane results in barycentric coordinates.

By Lexell's theorem, the locus of points with one coordinate constant is the corresponding Lexell circle. It is thus possible to find the point corresponding to a given triple of spherical area coordinates by intersecting two small circles.

Using their respective spherical area coordinates, any spherical triangle can be mapped to any other, or to any planar triangle, using corresponding barycentric coordinates in the plane. This can be used for polyhedral map projections; for the definition of discrete global grids; or for parametrizing triangulations of the sphere or texture mapping any triangular mesh topologically equivalent to a sphere.

== Euclidean plane ==
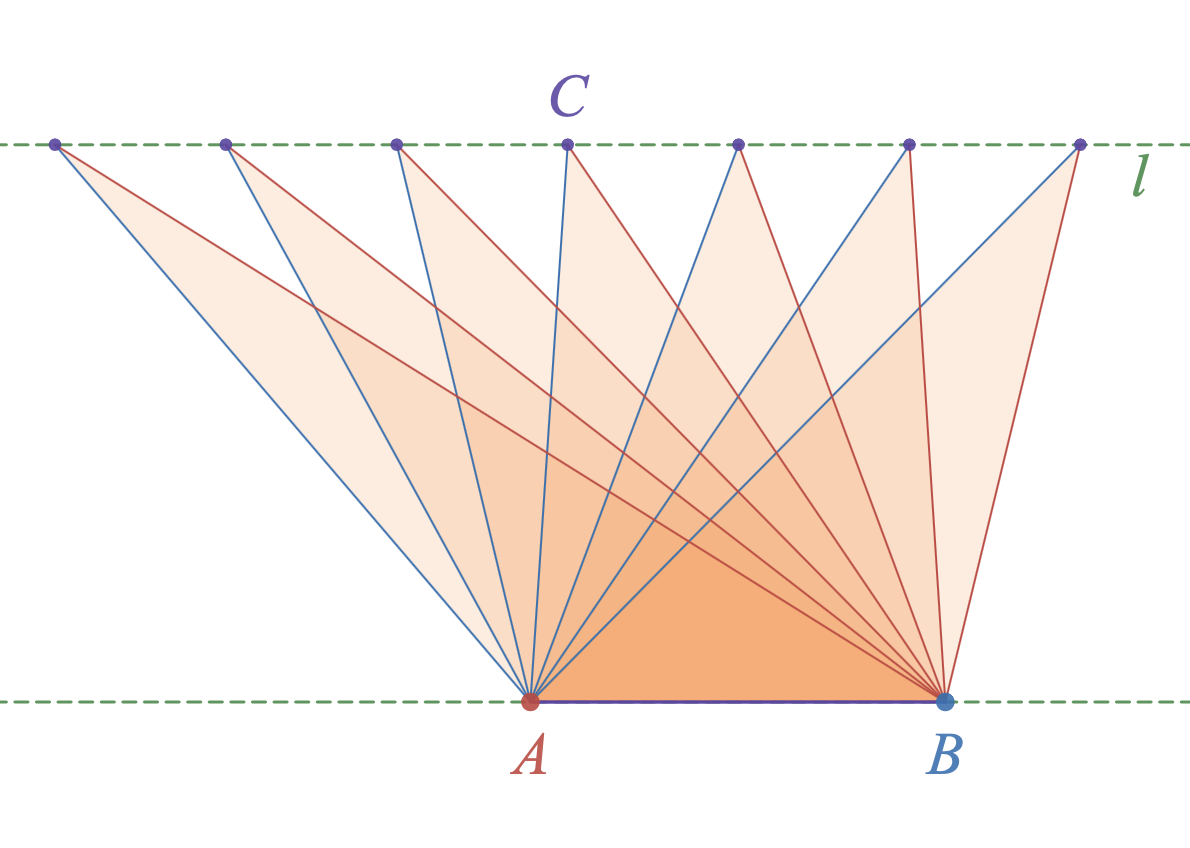
Orange triangles △ABC share a base AB and area. The locus of their apex C is a line (dashed green) parallel to the base.

The analog of Lexell's theorem in the Euclidean plane comes from antiquity, and can be found in Book I of Euclid's Elements, propositions 37 and 39, built on proposition 35. In the plane, Lexell's circle degenerates to a Lexell's line) parallel to the base.

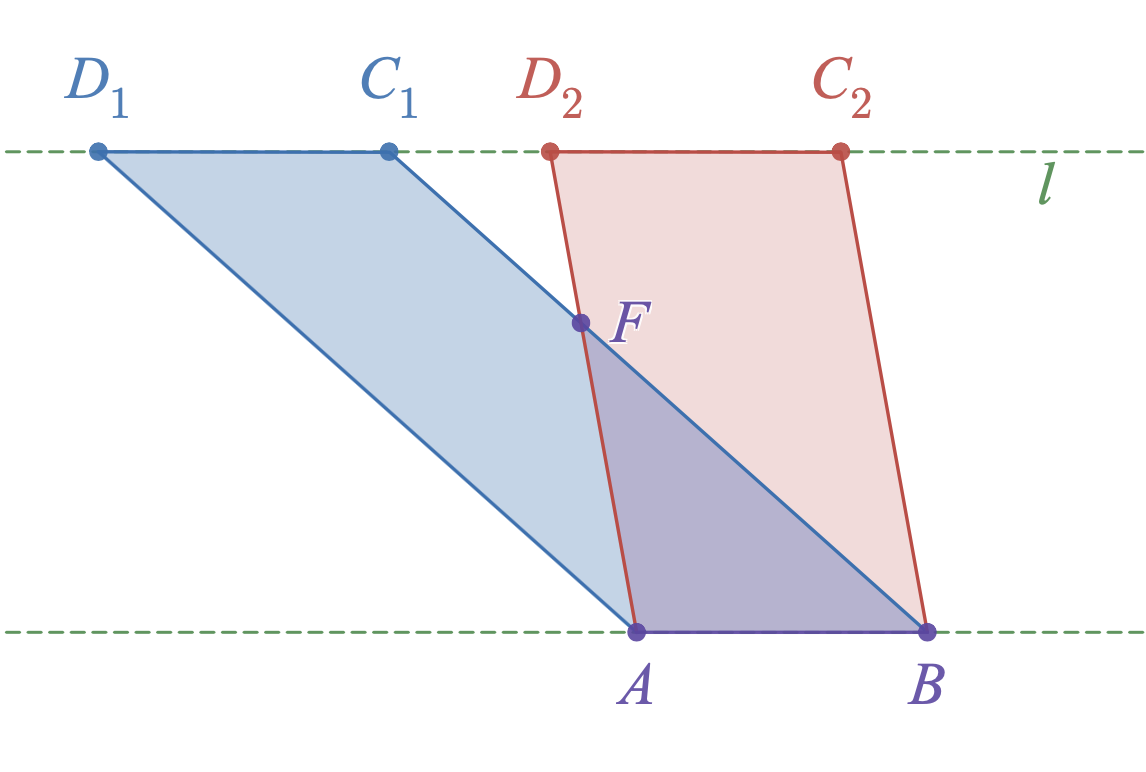
Elements I.35

Elements I.35 holds that parallelograms with the same base whose top sides are colinear have equal area. Proof: Let the two parallelograms be $\square ABC_1D_1$ and $\square ABC_2D_2,$ with common base $AB$ and $C_1,$ $D_1,$ $C_2,$ and $D_2$ on a common line parallel to the base, and let $F$ be the intersection between $BC_1$ and $AD_2.$ Then the two top sides are congruent $C_1D_1 \cong C_2D_2$ so, adding the intermediate segment to each, $C_1C_2 \cong D_1D_2.$ Therefore the two triangles $\triangle BC_1C_2$ and $\triangle AD_1D_2$ have matching sides so are congruent. Now each of the parallelograms is formed from one of these triangles, added to the triangle $\triangle ABF$ with the triangle $\triangle D_2C_1F$ cut away, so therefore the two parallelograms $\square ABC_1D_1$ and $\square ABC_2D_2$ have equal area.

Elements I.37 holds that triangles with the same base and an apex on the same line parallel to the base have equal area. Proof: Let triangles $\triangle ABC_1$ and $\triangle ABC_2$ each have its apex on the same line $l$ parallel to the base $AB.$ Construct new segments $C_1D_1$ and $C_2D_2$ congruent to $AB$ with vertices $D_1$ and $D_2$ on $l.$ The two quadrilaterals $\square ABC_1D_1$ and $\square ABC_2D_2$ are parallelograms, each formed by pasting together the respective triangle and a congruent copy. By I.35, the two parallelograms have the same area, so the original triangles must also have the same area.

Elements I.39 is the converse: two triangles of equal area on the same side of the same base have their apexes on a line parallel to the base. Proof: If two triangles have the same base and same area and the apex of the second is assumed to not lie on the line parallel to the base (the "Lexell line") through the first, then the line through one side of the second triangle can be intersected with the Lexell line to form a new triangle which has a different area from the second triangle but the same area as the first triangle, a contradiction.

In the Euclidean plane, the area $\varepsilon$ of triangle $\triangle ABC$ can be computed using any side length (the base) and the distance between the line through the base and the parallel line through the apex (the corresponding height). Using point $C$ as the apex, and multiplying both sides of the traditional identity by $\tfrac12$ to make the analogy to the spherical case more obvious, this is:

$$\tfrac12 \varepsilon = \tfrac12 c\,\tfrac12 h_c.$$

The Euclidean theorem can be taken as a corollary of Lexell's theorem on the sphere. It is the limiting case as the curvature of the sphere approaches zero, i.e. for spherical triangles as which are infinitesimal in proportion to the radius of the sphere.

== Hyperbolic plane ==
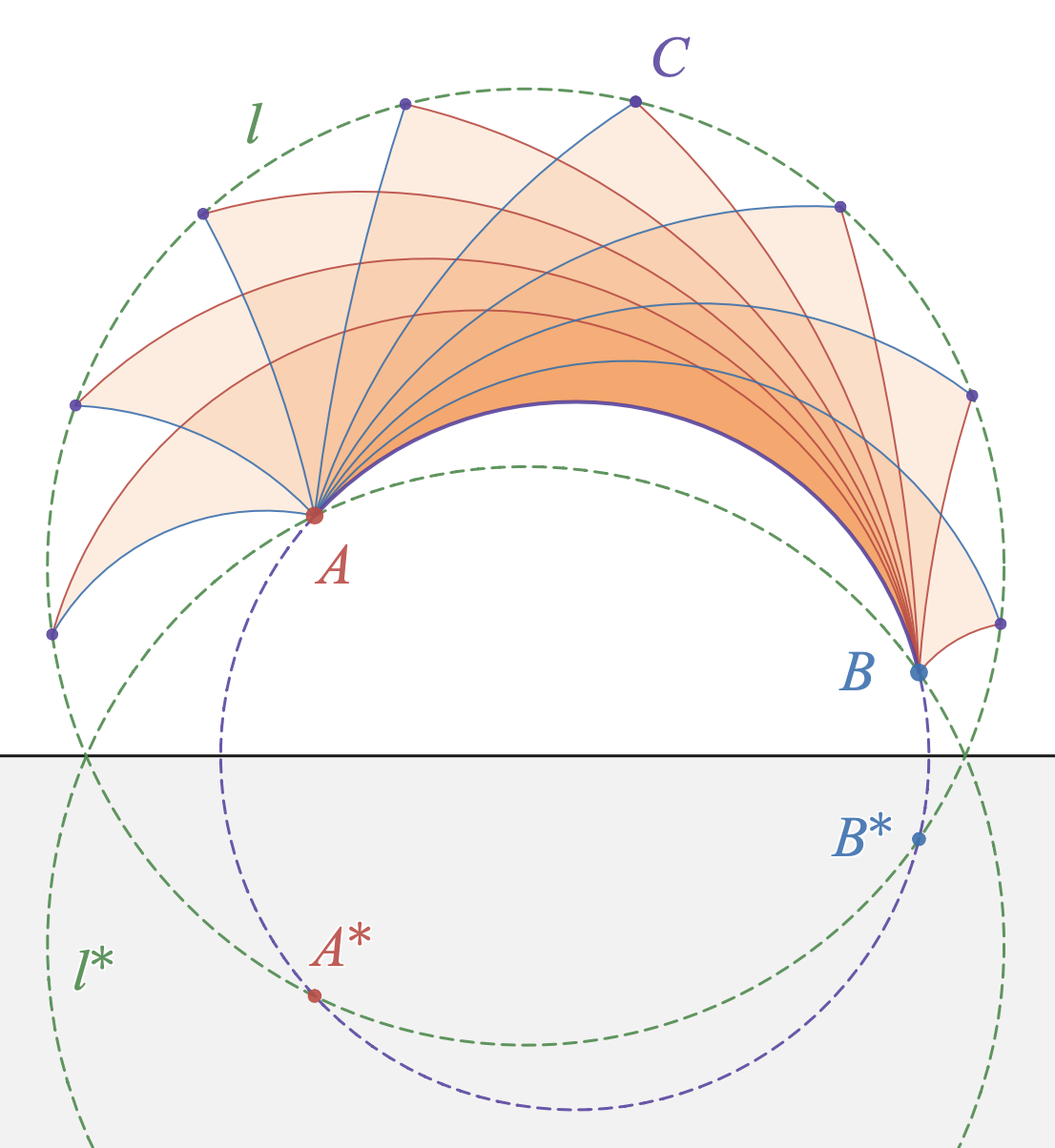
In the half-plane model, antipodal points are reflections into the opposite half-plane (shaded gray). Hyperbolic triangles △ABC (orange) share a base AB and area. The locus of apex C is a hypercycle (dashed green) passing through points antipodal to A and B.

In the hyperbolic plane, given a triangle $\triangle ABC,$ the locus of a variable point $X$ such that the triangle $\triangle ABX$ has the same area as $\triangle ABC$ is a hypercycle passing through the points antipodal to $A$ and $B,$ which could be called Lexell's hypercycle. Several proofs from the sphere have straightforward analogs in the hyperbolic plane, including a Gauss-style proof via a Saccheri quadrilateral by Barbarin (1902) and Frenkel & Su (2019), an Euler-style proof via hyperbolic parallelograms by Papadopoulos & Su (2017), and a Paul Serret-style proof via stereographic projection by Shvartsman (2007).

In spherical geometry, the antipodal transformation takes each point to its antipodal (diametrically opposite) point. For a sphere embedded in Euclidean space, this is a point reflection through the center of the sphere; for a sphere stereographically projected to the plane, it is an inversion across the primitive circle composed with a point reflection across the origin (or equivalently, an inversion in a circle of imaginary radius of the same magnitude as the radius of the primitive circle).

In planar hyperbolic geometry, there is a similar antipodal transformation, but any two antipodal points lie in opposite branches of a double hyperbolic plane. For a hyperboloid of two sheets embedded in Minkowski space of signature $(-, +, +),$ known as the hyperboloid model, the antipodal transformation is a point reflection through the center of the hyperboloid which takes each point onto the opposite sheet; in the conformal half-plane model it is a reflection across the boundary line of ideal points taking each point into the opposite half-plane; in the conformal disk model it is an inversion across the boundary circle, taking each point in the disk to a point in its complement. As on the sphere, any generalized circle passing through a pair of antipodal points in hyperbolic geometry is a geodesic.

Analogous to the planar and spherical triangle area formulas, the hyperbolic area $\varepsilon$ of the triangle can be computed in terms of the base $c$ (the hyperbolic length of arc $AB$) and "height" $h_c$ (the hyperbolic distance between the parallel hypercycles $A^{*~\!\!} B^{*~\!\!} C$ and $A B C^{*~\!\!}$):

$$\sin \tfrac12 \varepsilon = \tanh\tfrac12 c \, \tanh\tfrac12 h_c.$$

As in the spherical case, in the small-triangle limit this reduces to the planar formula.
