= Allardyce =

Allardyce is both a surname and a given name. Notable people with the name include:

Surname

- Alexander Allardyce (1846–1896), Scottish author
- Constance, Lady Allardyce (1861–1919), Australian paleontologist
- Craig Allardyce (born 1975), English football manager and former player and agent, son of Sam Allardyce
- Paula Allardyce, a pseudonym of Ursula Torday (1912–1997), novelist
- Sam Allardyce (born 1954), English football manager and retired player, father of Craig Allardyce
- William Allardyce (1861–1930), British civil servant, governor of several former colonies

Given name

- Allardyce Mallon (born 1965), Scottish composer, conductor, repetiteur and pianist
- Allardyce Nicoll (1894–1976), Scottish literary scholar and teacher

== See also ==
- Allardyce Range, mountain range in South Georgia, an island in the South Atlantic
- Rosita Harbour, a.k.a. Allardyce Harbour, also in South Georgia
- Allardice (disambiguation)
- Alexander Allardyce
