= Hornpipe =

Dance

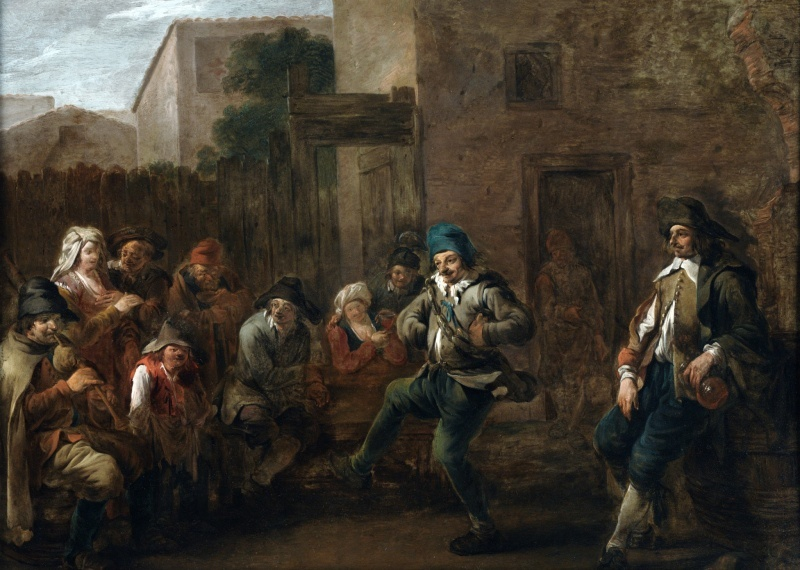
The Hornpipe by Andries Both

The hornpipe is any of several dance forms and their associated tunes, played and danced in Great Britain and Ireland and elsewhere from the 16th century until the present day. The dance is still performed in competition. George Frideric Handel's hornpipe from Water Music is one of his most famous compositions.

== History ==
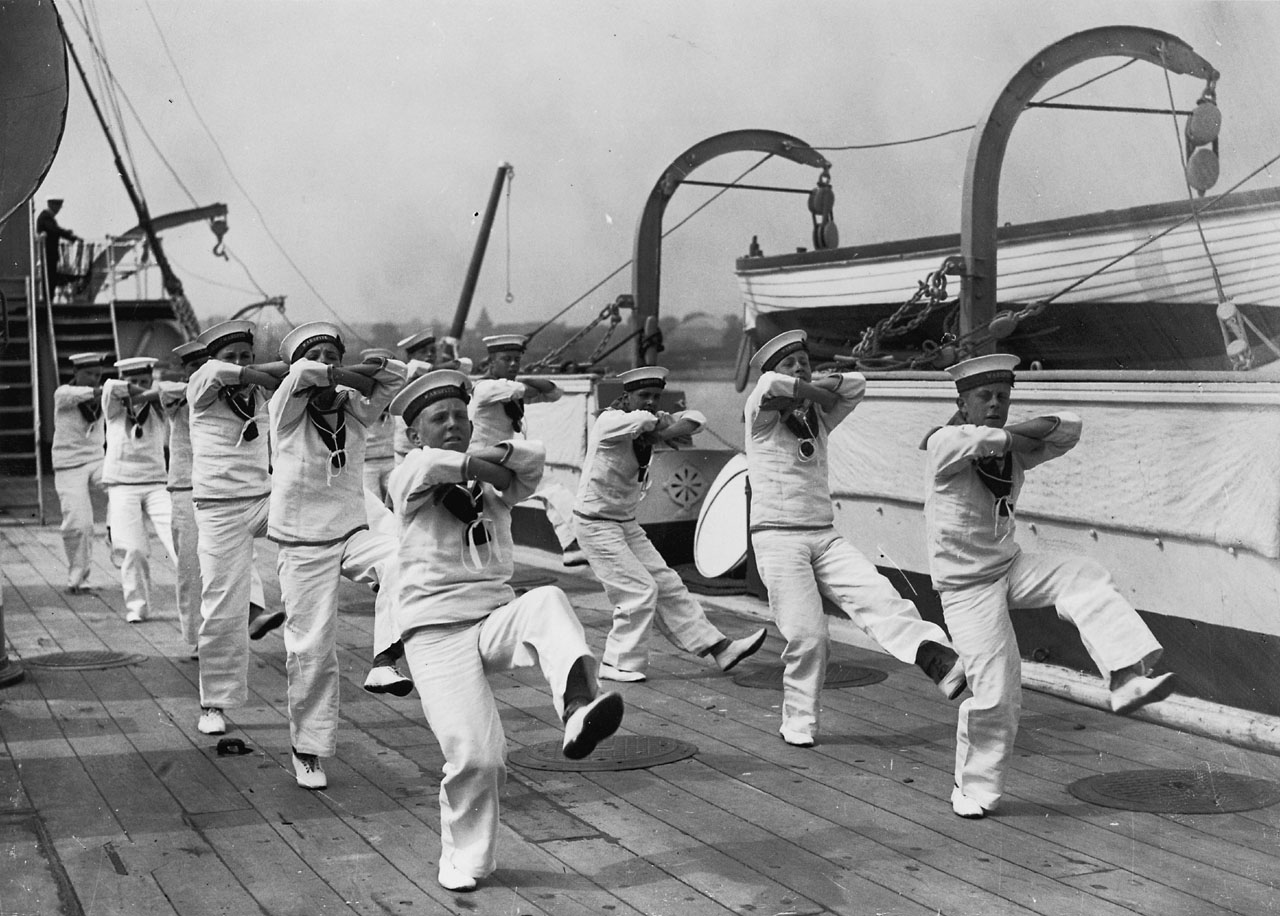
British naval cadets dancing the sailor's hornpipe in 1928

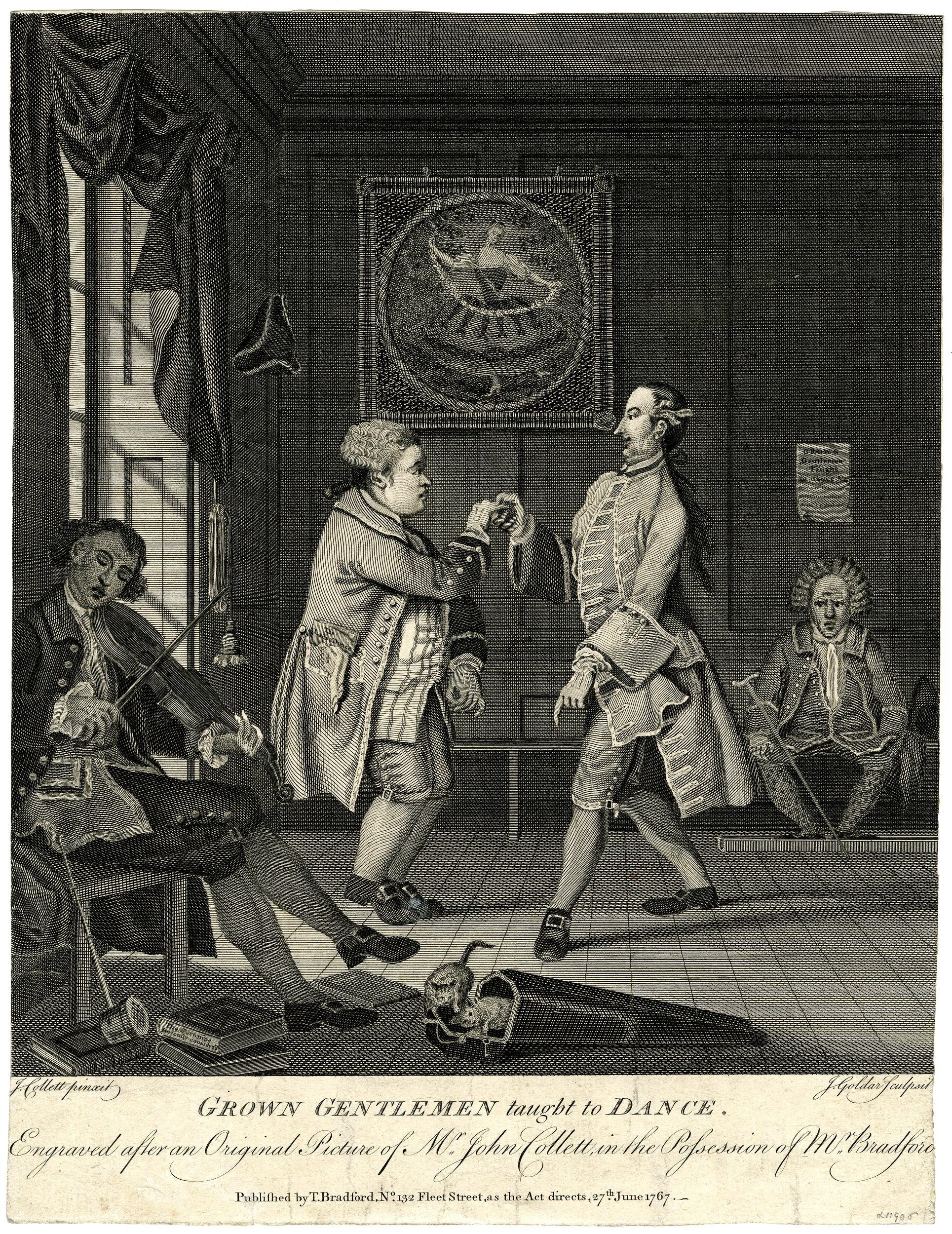
"Grown Gentlemen Taught to Dance" (1767) depicts the teaching of country dance. A book of hornpipes is visible at the fiddler's feet.

Hornpipes are a class of wind instruments. One candidate for the specific hornpipe that might have lent its name to the dance is the pib-corn. There is no clear evidence the dance was named after any instrument, and many alternative etymologies have been proposed.

References to hornpipes abound in literature. Geoffrey Chaucer's 14th century translation of The Romaunt of the Rose mentions the hornpipe as a Cornish instrument. In a 1609 pamphlet titled Old Meg of Hereford-shire, the hornpipe dance is described as a product of Lancashire. Michael Drayton dwells on "Lancastrian nymphs" dancing the hornpipe in Poly-Olbion (1612). In The King's Entertainment at Welbeck (1633), Ben Jonson describes it as a dance native to Nottingham and Darbishire.

The hornpipe became a regular feature of English theater. Dancers would perform hornpipes between the acts of larger stage works. Many tunes were named after the dancers who performed them: Fishar's Hornpipe, Aldridge's Hornpipe, Richar's Hornpipe, Miss Baker's Hornpipe, West's Hornpipe, Durang's Hornpipe, etc. One of the standard dances became the "sailor's hornpipe", where the performer would appear as Jack Tar and emulate the life aboard ship. By the 19th century, the ability to dance a hornpipe was a basic part of an entertainer's toolkit.

A legend took hold that reversed the origin of the hornpipe. In some tellings it was invented by sailors stuck in the doldrums. In fact, the popular dance was adopted by sailors like Captain Cook who recognized it as an effective exercise routine aboard ships which have limited space. It soon became a popular pastime and an official part of Royal Navy training.

Charles Dickens mentions the hornpipe in Dombey & Son and Martin Chuzzlewit. He was also a skilled dancer of the sailor's hornpipe. Thomas Hardy describes country dances in the seventh chapter of Under the Greenwood Tree (1872). In a 1926 letter, he recalls that he must have had in mind the "College Hornpipe", among other dances. He also included his notation of the hornpipe as he recalled it six decades later.

== Dance ==
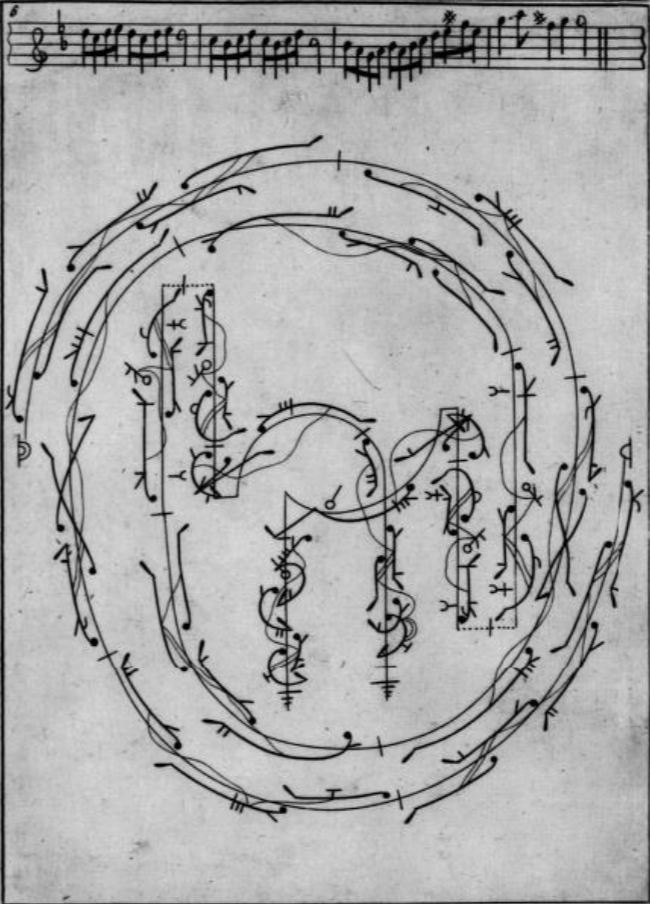
Beauchamp-Feuillet notation for "The Richmond", a modified hornpipe dance (1706).

The country dance form of the hornpipe differs from the solo step dance. Couples execute a series of steps and turns in an endless variety of combinations. In an 1816 dance manual, the "College Hornpipe" requires, among other movements, the "top couple to swing with the right hand round the second couple, then swing with the left hand". In the 18th century, dancing masters were widely employed to teach these dances to English gentility. There are hornpipes in Beauchamp-Feuillet notation.

Solo hornpipes were typically danced with folded arms as a display of strength. One dance historian described the posture as a demonstration of the English spirit, "The upper part of the body is kept in a state of calm repose, while the lower limbs are executing the most complicated, rapid, and difficult move-ments. Is not all this typical of an ideally English trait? To appear calm and collected amid circumstances calculated to induce a condition of physical and mental agitation."

A travelogue from 1798 described hornpipes being danced at a ball in Wales, "The ball was concluded by a contest of agility between two brothers, who danced two distinct hornpipes with so much power and muscle, variety of step and inflexible perseverance, as exceeded everything we had seen." A typical response from female dancers would be something like a cotillion.

=== Competition ===
In competition, the hornpipe is a hard shoe dance, which enables judges to hear the steps. In Ireland, the dance is traditionally performed by men. Dancers will use slower tempi to show off their virtuosity. An Coimisiún Le Rincí Gaelacha requires a minimum tempo in competition of 76 beats per minute, and the standard tempo is 113 bpm.

== Music ==
Hornpipes were originally in triple meters like 3/2, 6/2, 9/4, or 9/8. In 1776, John Hawkins explained, "The measure of the Hornpipe is triple time of six crotchets in a bar, four whereof are to be beat with a down, and two with an up hand."

In 1853, William Stenhouse enthused that tunes like "Wee Totum Fogg", "The Dusty Miller", "Go to Berwick, Johnnie", "Mount your Baggage", "Robin Shure in Har'est" have been played in Scotland "time out of mind". Tunes that were catalogued in the 18th century in collections like the William Dixon manuscript remained virtually unchanged when transcribed by 20th century practitioners like Tom Clough.

By the time John Playford was anthologizing hornpipes in collections like Apollo's Banquet (1669), the melodies could be categorized into subgenres like bagpipe-hornpipes, jig-hornpipes, or hornpipe-jigs. An important feature of hornpipes were the divisions in the tune which enabled repetition and variation. A 9/8 hornpipe, or slip jig, like "Mad Moll" went through several manifestations. It turns up in John Gay's ballad opera Polly (1729). It was anthologized twice in The Dancing Master, once as "Mad Moll" and again as "The Virgin Queen".

"Alla hornpipe" from G.F. Handel's Water Music, United States Marine Band
"Alla hornpipe" from G.F. Handel's Water Music, United States Marine Band

The hornpipe was often used in dance suites by Baroque composers like Guillaume de Morlaye, Antony Holborne, William Byrd, and Thomas Arne. Hugh Aston's Hornepype of 1522 is one of the earliest known examples of a composer writing for the dance form. Henry Purcell and George Frideric Handel composed hornpipes and considered the rhythm as characteristically English.

Purcell's "Hornpipe No. 8" from the incidental music for Abdelazer (1695) was anthologized by Playford. The hornpipe also provided the vehicle for one of classical music's most famous melodies in Handel's Water Music (1717). The movement is titled "Alla Hornpipe", a marking Handel also used in Semele (1744). By that time, hornpipes had become shorthand for carefree quirkiness in classical music.

By the 19th century, the hornpipe definitively evolved into common time (4/4) and its variants. "The Sailor's Hornpipe" is the most widely known melody from this latter style. Its even rhythm is distinct from the dotted rhythms of hornpipes like "The Harvest Home". A hybrid of these two rhythms became known as the "Newcastle Style".

Many hornpipes were written during the 19th century, like "The Groves" and "The Boys of Bluehill" in Ireland. The fiddler-publican James Hill was a noted English composer of hornpipes. After the assassination of President James A. Garfield in 1881, a hornpipe was written in his honor.

== See also ==
- Egg dance
- Reel (dance)
- Jig
- Polka
- Mazurka
- Slide (tune type)
- Highland fling
- Schottische
- Strathspey (dance)
- The Sailor's Hornpipe
- Waltz
