= Robert Allardice =

Robert Allardice may refer to:

- Robert Edgar Allardice, Scottish mathematician
- Robert R. Allardice, United States Air Force officer
- Robert Barclay Allardice, Scottish walker
