= Charles Kirkpatrick Sharpe =

Scottish antiquary and artist

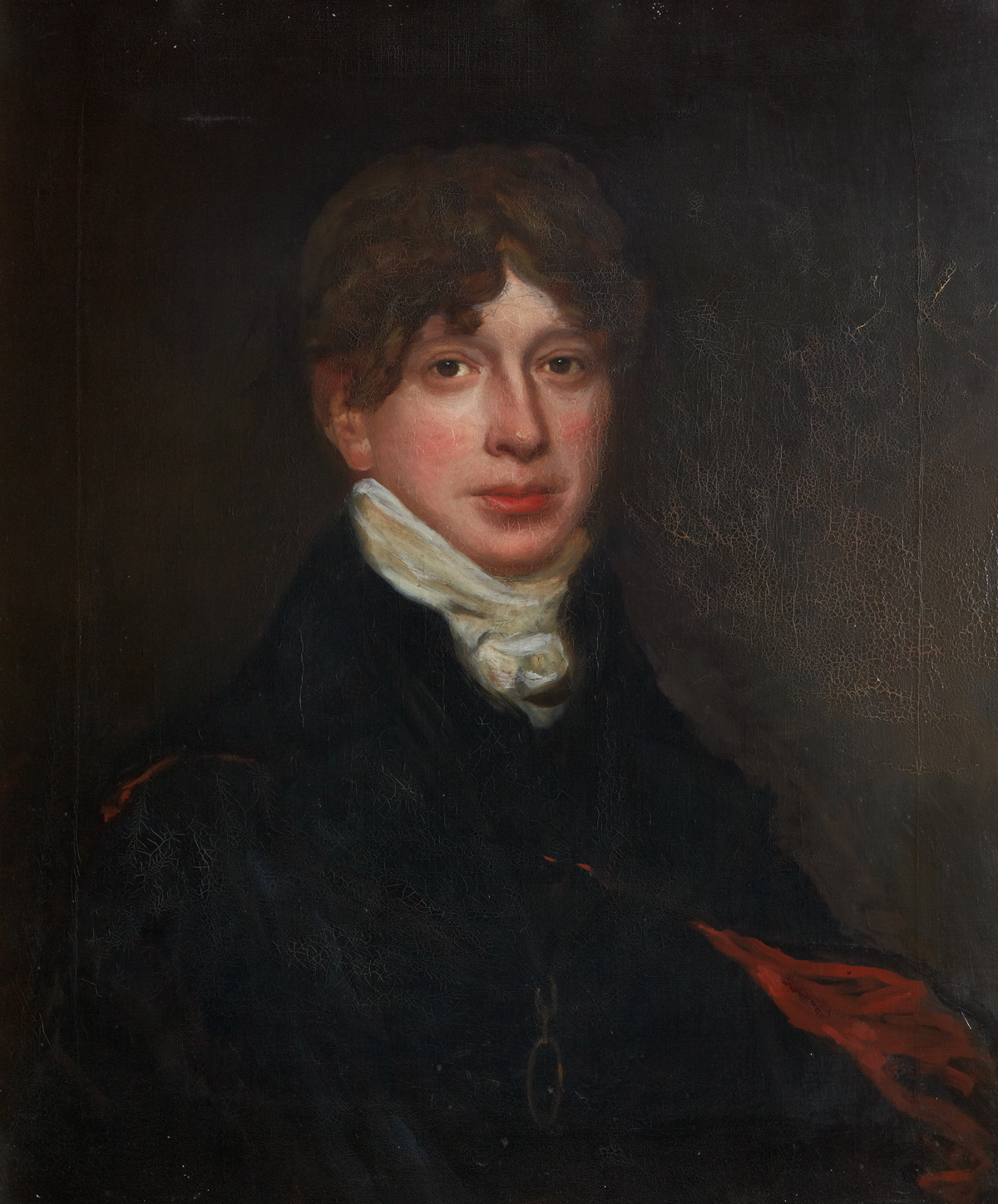
- Charles Kirkpatrick Sharpe, 1829 portrait
- Born: 15 May 1781; Hoddam Castle, Scotland
- Died: 17 March 1851 (aged 69); Edinburgh, Scotland

Charles Kirkpatrick Sharpe (15 May 1781 – 17 March 1851) was a Scottish antiquary and artist.

== Life ==
He was the second son of Charles Sharpe (originally Charles Kirkpatrick) of Hoddam, Dumfriesshire, by Eleonora, youngest daughter of John Renton of Lamerton, born on 15 May 1781. He went to Edinburgh for schooling in 1796, and in October of that year joined John Robison's class at Edinburgh University. He returned home in May 1798.

With a view to taking orders in the Scottish Episcopal Church, Sharpe matriculated in 1798 at Christ Church, Oxford, where he graduated B.A. 17 June 1802, and M.A. 28 June 1806. Not fitting in at his college in terms of social activity, he devoted himself mainly to antiquarian research and drawing.

Instead of entering the church, Sharpe took up residence in Edinburgh in 1827, first living at 93 Princes Street a fine house facing directly onto Edinburgh Castle. He later moved to 28 Drummond Place in Edinburgh's Second New Town.

Whilst being a welcome guest in society, he was in fact a literary recluse, who made no effort to keep up with fashion in his dress.

His artefact collection included the coat-of-arms from Cardinal Beaton's (Bethune's) house on the Cowgate in Edinburgh. Sharpe died unmarried, 17 March 1851.

== Works ==
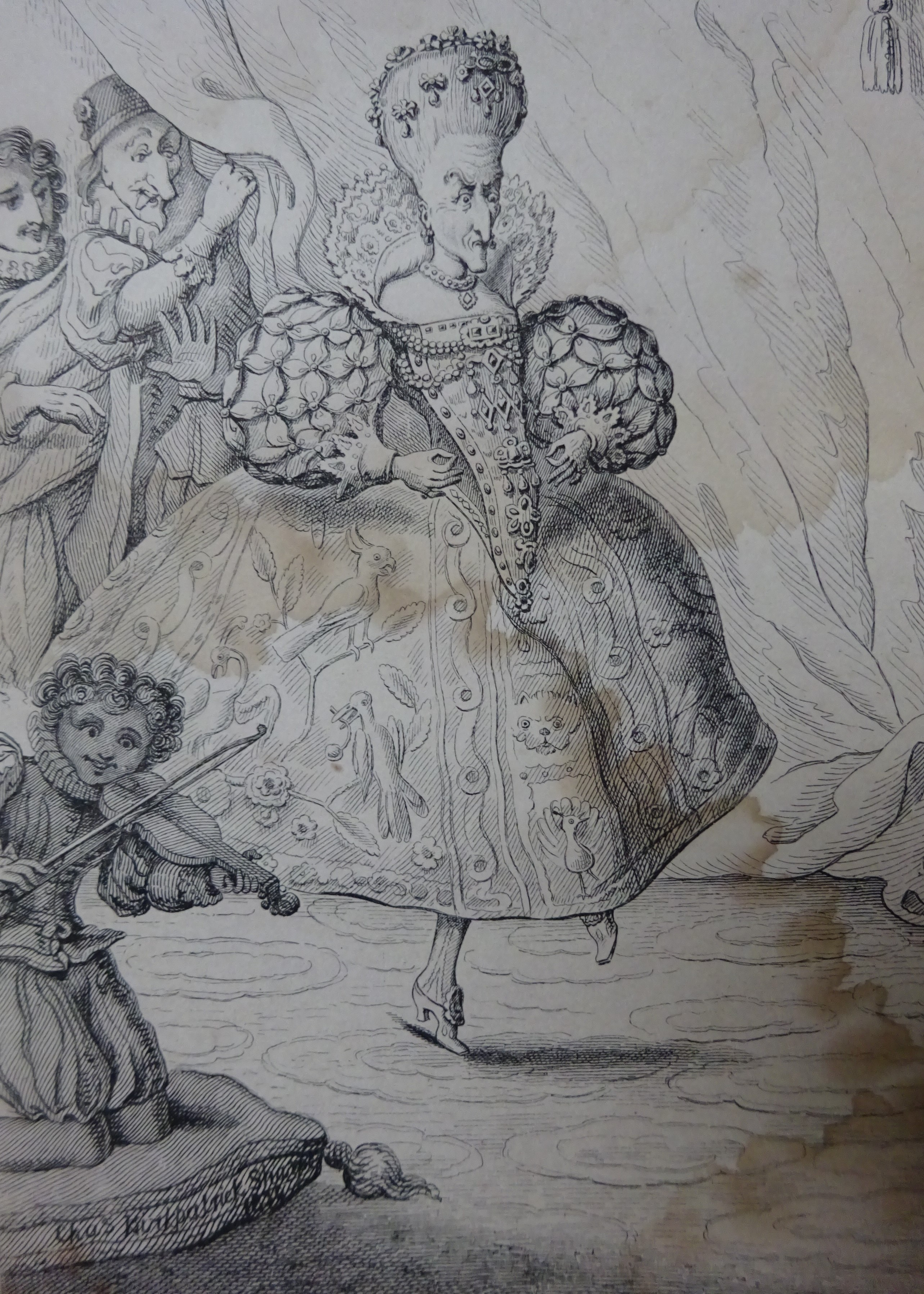
Elizabeth I dancing, observed by Roger Aston, after a drawing by Charles Kirkpatrick Sharpe.

Sharpe contributed ballads to the second volume of Walter Scott's Border Minstrelsy. In 1807 he also published at Oxford Metrical Legends and other Poems. In 1823 he published his Ballad Book, which in 1880 was re-edited by David Laing, with additions from Sharpe's manuscripts. To Laing's edition of William Stenhouse's notes to James Johnson's Scots Musical Museum (1853), he made some contributions.

In 1817 Sharpe edited James Kirkton's Secret and True History of the Church of Scotland from the Restoration to the Year 1678, with an Account of the Murder of Archbishop Sharpe, by James Russell, an Actor therein, with notes. It was followed in 1820 by an edition of Robert Law's Memorialls; or the considerable Things that fell out within the Island of Great Britain from 1638 to 1684, containing information on witchcraft and related topics. In 1827 he edited A Part of the Life of Lady Margaret Cunninghame, daughter of the Earl of Glencairn, that she had with her first Husband, the Earl of Evandale; in 1828 (for the Bannatyne Club), The Letters of Archibald, Earl of Argyle; and in 1837, Surgundo, or the Valiant Christian, a Catholic song for the victory at the Battle of Glenlivet in 1594; and the same year, Minuets and Songs of Thomas, sixth Earl of Kellie.

In drawing, Sharpe's strength was satirical or grotesque caricature. His frontispieces and illustrations in the Bannatyne Club and other antiquarian publications applied antiquarian knowledge. In 1833 he published a volume of etchings, under the title Portraits of an Amateur, and his Etchings, with Photographs from Original Drawings, Poetical and Prose Fragments, appeared after his death at Edinburgh in 1869. Sharpe made a satirical drawing of Elizabeth I in old age dancing in old age to demonstrate to Roger Aston, the envoy of James VI, that she was still fit and lively. A version was published as a frontispiece for William Turnbull's Letters of Mary Stuart.

The Letters to and from C. K. Sharpe (1888) were edited by Alexander Allardyce, 1888.
