= Alexander Allardyce =

Alexander Allardyce may refer to:

- Alexander Allardyce (author) (1846–1896), Scottish author
- Alexander Allardyce (politician) (1743–1801), Scotland-born MP for Aberdeen Burghs
