= Allardice =

Allardice is a surname of Scottish origin deriving from the name of a town in Kincardineshire (Alrethes) where the family was located. Notable people with the surname include:

- Geoff Allardice (born 1967), Australian cricketer
- James B. Allardice (1919–1966), American television comedy writer
- Lesley Allardice (born 1957), British swimmer
- Michael Allardice (born 1991), New Zealand rugby player
- Robert Barclay Allardice (1779–1854), Scottish Laird and sport walker
- Robert Edgar Allardice (1862–1928), Scottish mathematician
- Robert R. Allardice (born c. 1958), American air force general
- Scott Allardice (born 1998), Scottish football player

== See also ==
- Allardice Castle, a sixteenth-century manor house in Kincardineshire, Scotland
- Allardyce
