= Ignace-Louis-Alfred Le Cointe =

Ignace-Louis-Alfred Le Cointe (14 September 1823 – 18 June 1893, sometimes called Alfred Lecointe) was a French mathematician, mathematics teacher, and Jesuit priest. He wrote textbooks about trigonometry and conic sections and a book of problems at the secondary level.

== Life ==
Le Cointe was born 14 September 1823, in Nîmes, to a devout and illustrious family. He had an early interest and aptitude for exact sciences, so was sent to Paris to attend the École Centrale at an unusually young age. In 1847, joined the Jesuit order, and was sent to study philosophy at the seminary in Vals. He taught mathematics in Vals, at the Collége Saint-Michel in Saint-Étienne, at the École Sainte-Marie in Toulouse, and at the Institut Catholique de Toulouse. He died in Toulouse.

== Bibliography ==
=== Books ===
- Le Cointe, I.-L.-A. (1851), Développements relatifs à quelques théories accessibles à la géométrie élémentaire [Developments relating to some theories accessible to elementary geometry], Vals: Self published
- ——— (1852), Programme d'un cours de mathématiques élémentaires [Program for an elementary mathematics course], Vals: Self published
- ——— (1858), Leçons sur la théorie des fonctions circulaires et la trigonométrie [Lessons on the theory of circular functions and trigonometry], Paris: Mallet-Bachelier
- ——— (1864), Notions élementaires sur les courbes usuelles [Elementary notions about common curves], Paris: Gauthier-Villars
- ——— (1865), Solutions développées de 300 problèmes qui ont été proposés dans les compositions mathématiques pour l'admission au grade de bachelier ès sciences dans diverses facultés de France, Paris: Gauthier-Villars

=== Papers ===
- Le Cointe, I.-L.-A. (1851), "Rectification au sujet du théorème triangulaire de Fontaine" [Correction on the subject of Fontaine's triangle theorem], Nouvelles Annales de Mathématiques, 10: 196–197
- ——— (1852), "Solution de la question 235: Résoudre en nombres entiers $\textstyle x^y = y^x$" [Solve in integers $\textstyle x^y = y^x$], Nouvelles Annales de Mathématiques, 11: 187–189
- ——— (1852), "Solution de la question 228: Trois sommets $A$, $B$, $C$ d'un triangle et les trois sommets $A'$, $B'$, $C'$ d'un tétraèdre sont donnés, etc." [Three vertices $A$, $B$, $C$ of a triangle and three vertices $A'$, $B'$, $C'$ of a tetrahedron are given, etc.], Nouvelles Annales de Mathématiques, 11: 314–316
- ——— (1853), "Démonstration élémentaire d'une propriété de la projection stéréographique" [Elementary demonstration of a property of the stereographic projection], Nouvelles Annales de Mathématiques, 12: 101–102
- ——— (1861), "Mémoire sur les déterminants cramériens ou résultantes algébriques" [Memoir on cramerian determinants or algebraic resultants], Annali di Matematica Pura ed Applicata, 4: 233–246
- ——— (1863), "Note relative à la fonction $\textstyle x^x$" [Note about the function $\textstyle x^x$], Annali di Matematica Pura ed Applicata, 5: 106–137
- ——— (1863), "Question sur un jeu de cartes" [Question about a card game], Annali di Matematica Pura ed Applicata, 5: 108–110
- ——— (1864), "Memoire sur les progressions des divers ordres" [Memoir on progressions of various orders], Annali di Matematica Pura ed Applicata, 6: 124–149
- ——— (1865), "Sur les diamètres des lignes et des surfaces en général, avec de nombreuses applications aux lignes et aux surfaces de second ordre", Comptes Rendus des Séances de l'Académie des Sciences, 60 (21): 1083–1085
- ——— (1865), "Note sur la theorie des nombres" [Note on number theory], Les Mondes, 8: 707–708
- ——— (1870), "Sur une question de minimum" [On a question of minimum], Nouvelles Annales de Mathématiques, 2e série, 18: 23–31
- ——— (1880), "Lieu des points de rencontre des tangentes communes à une conique et à un cercle" [Location of the intersection points of the common tangents to a conic and a circle], Nouvelles Annales de Mathématiques, 2nd série, 19: 122–133
