= Colunar triangle =

In spherical geometry, colunar triangles are spherical triangles which have one side in common and whose other sides belong to the same great circles.

A spherical triangle has three colunar triangles. Each one is created by replacing one of the vertices of the spherical triangle with its antipodal point (i.e. the point on the sphere which is diametrically opposite it). Together, a spherical triangle and one of its colunar triangles make up a spherical lune.

Modern treatments of the subject restrict the definition to colunar triangles to spherical triangles of a particular type, namely Schwarz triangles.
