= Scott Alderdice =

Australian writer

- Education: Victorian College of the Arts
- Occupations: Theatre Director; Acting Lecturer; Producer
- Years active: 1983-present

Scott Alderdice is a Shakespearean director, writer, media producer and acting lecturer currently based at the University of Southern Queensland in Toowoomba, Queensland, Australia. He is a graduate of the Victorian College of the Arts, and currently the Theatre Co-ordinator for the university's School of Creative Arts.

== Career ==
Mr. Alderdice is also the Director of Creative Events for the USQ Artsworx SiTP Festival Management Team, a position which enables him to direct the University of Southern Queensland's Shakespeare in the Park Festival, held annually since 2004. Scott has directed the main productions of Hamlet (2004), Macbeth (2007), Romeo and Juliet (2008), A Midsummer Night's Dream (2011), and another production Macbeth (2019).

Among these plays, Mr. Alderdice is also the director of production Love and Information (2019).

In 2017, he wrote the play Fire, which describes the story of the January 2013 catastrophic bushfire in the Warrumbungle National Park, Australia.
