= Allardyce Mallon =

Scottish composer, conductor, repetiteur and pianist (born 1965)

Allardyce Mallon is a Scottish composer, conductor, repetiteur and pianist.

He was born in Hong Kong in 1965, moving to Scotland at age nine. He was educated at University of Edinburgh, University of Surrey and Royal Scottish Academy of Music and Drama, then subsequently studied piano and conducting at the Conservatoire de Musique de Genève, in Geneva, Switzerland, from 1990 to 1994.

Mallon's style of composition has evolved over the last two decades. His early style was strongly influenced by his teachers Kenneth Leighton and James MacMillan, along with a number of American composers among them John Adams and William Schuman. His more recent work has crossed disciplines and has been permeated by influences spanning contemporary architecture, theatre and traditional diatonic elements. His "Visions and Interludes", premiered in Chicago in 1997, demonstrates architectonic elements as represented by sonic structures.

His many compositions include his 2008 Alba Song for Panpipes and Orchestra, which has been performed by the Volgograd Philharmonic Orchestra (VDE Gallo).

Mallon also demonstrates great skills at arranging and orchestration. For the Meiningen Opera he arranged Poulenc's La voix humaine as a chamber piece, and for the Brazilian television company Globo he worked on the series Os Maias.

He has acted as a repetiteur and conductor for many orchestras and opera companies in Europe and North America.

Mallon was awarded the Tovey Memorial Prize for composition in 1988. He won the Young Scottish Composer of the Year Award, sponsored by Shell, in 1989.
