= Craig Alderdice =

Australian rules footballer (born 1961)

Personal information
- Born: 2 August 1961 (age 65)
- Original team: Union
- Height: 196 cm (6 ft 5 in)
- Weight: 86 kg (190 lb)

Playing career^{1}
Years	Club	Games (Goals)
1985–1988	Geelong	25 (19)
- ^{1} Playing statistics correct to the end of 1988.

Craig Alderdice (born 2 August 1961) is a former Australian rules footballer who played with Geelong in the Victorian Football League (VFL).

Alderdice played 25 senior games for Geelong, 12 of them in the 1985 VFL season. He missed 1986 with injury, returned to play twice in 1987 and made 11 appearances in 1988. At the end of the 1989 VFL season, where he failed to play a senior game, Alderdice was cut from Geelong's list.
