= William Stenhouse =

Scottish antiquarian

- Born: 1773? Roxburghshire
- Died: 10 November 1827; Edinburgh
- Occupation: Antiquarian

William Stenhouse (1773? – 10 November 1827) was a Scottish antiquarian.

== Biography ==
Stenhouse was a native of Roxburghshire, and was born about 1773 (Laing). He became an accountant in Edinburgh. He published ‘Tables of Simple Interest and of Commission Brokerage or Exchange’ (Edinburgh, 1806). He died in Edinburgh on 10 November 1827, and was buried in St. Cuthbert's churchyard.

Stenhouse was an antiquary with strong musical leanings. He is best known by his notes in the 1839 (Edinburgh) reprint of James Johnson's ‘Musical Museum,’ which he edited. These notes, valuable yet inaccurate in many particulars, have been extensively quoted by biographers of the poet Robert Burns and by editors of Scottish songs. They were reprinted, with additions, in David Laing's edition of the ‘Museum’ (Edinburgh, 1853).
