= Alexander Allardyce (author) =

Scottish author, journalist and historian

- Born: 21 January 1846
- Died: 23 April 1896 (aged 50)
- Education: Aberdeen Grammar School; University of Aberdeen
- Occupation: Author

Alexander Allardyce (21 January 1846 – 23 April 1896) was a Scottish author, journalist and historian. He wrote for Friend of India, Indian Statesman, Fraser's Magazine, and the Spectator, among other publications, and was at one time the editor of the Ceylon Times.

== Life ==
Allardyce was the son of James Allardyce, farmer, born on 21 January 1846 at Tilly-minit, Gartly, parish of Rhynie, Aberdeenshire. Receiving his first lessons in Latin from his maternal grandmother), he was educated at Rhynie parish school, Aberdeen Grammar School, and the University of Aberdeen. In 1868 he became sub-editor of the Friend of India at Serampore, Bengal. Lord Mayo appreciated him so highly that he offered him an assistant-commissionership, but Allardyce kept to journalism.

Allardyce wrote for the Friend of India until 1875, having apparently at the same time done work for the Indian Statesman. In 1875, he succeeded John Capper as editor of the Ceylon Times, and one of his early experiences of office was tendering an apology to the judicial bench for contempt.

Returning to Europe, Allardyce was for a time at Berlin and afterwards in London, where he wrote for Fraser's Magazine, The Spectator, and other periodicals. In 1877 he settled at Edinburgh as reader to the house of Messrs. William Blackwood and Sons, and assistant-editor of Blackwood's Magazine. He died at Portobello on 23 April 1896, and was buried in Rhynie parish churchyard, Aberdeenshire.

== Works ==
Allardyce wrote:

- The City of Sunshine, 1877; 2nd edit. 1894; a tale of Indian life and manners.
- Memoir of Viscount Keith of Stonehaven Marischal, Admiral of the Red, 1882.
- Balmoral, a Romance of the Queen's Country, 1893; a Jacobite tale.
- Earlscourt, a Novel of Provincial Life, 1894.

In 1888 he edited two rare works (each in 2 vols.):

- the Ochtertyre MSS. of John Ramsay under the title of Scotland and Scotsmen in the Eighteenth Century, and
- Letters from and to Charles Kirkpatrick Sharpe.

Allardyce regularly wrote political and literary articles for Blackwood's Magazine, and short stories as in the third series of Tales from Blackwood. At the time of his death he was preparing the volume on Aberdeenshire for Messrs. Blackwood's series of county histories.

== Family ==
When comparatively young Allardyce married his cousin, Barbara Anderson, who survived him. There were no children.
