= Robert Edgar Allardice =

Scottish mathematician (1862–1928)

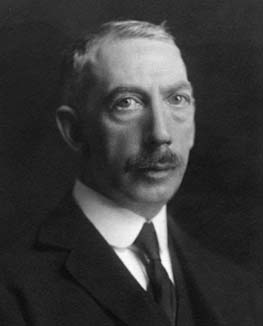
- Born: 2 March 1862; Edinburgh
- Died: 6 May 1928 (aged 66); Palo Alto
- Known for: establishing the Mathematics Department of Stanford University
- Scientific career
- Fields: Mathematics

Robert Edgar Allardice FRSE (1862 – 1928) was a Scottish mathematician, specializing in geometry.

== Biography ==
Allardice matriculated in 1879 at the University of Edinburgh and received there in 1882 an M.A. in mathematics. In 1883 Allardice became assistant in mathematics to Professor George Chrystal at the University of Edinburgh and remained there until 1892. In 1892 Allardice was appointed a professor to Stanford University at the start of the university's second year and immediately became the head of the mathematics department, continuing in that position until his retirement in 1927. For many years, the senior faculty in mathematics at Stanford University consisted of Allardice and Rufus Green. The Stanford mathematics department, with Allardice as head, recruited Hans Frederick Blichfeldt and George Abram Miller.

Allardice was a founder member of the Edinburgh Mathematical Society, joining in February 1883. He served on the committee of the Society from its foundation. He was Vice-President of the Society from 1889 to 1890, President of the Society in session 1890-91, and Editor of Proceedings of the Edinburgh Mathematical Society in session 1891-92, his final year in Edinburgh.

On 16 January 1888 he was elected A Fellow of the Royal Society of Edinburgh. His proposers were George Chrystal, Robert McNair Ferguson, John Sturgeon Mackay, and Peter Guthrie Tait.

After suffering from a lingering illness for over a year, Allardice died in 1928 from a lung infection. He never married and upon his death was survived by a sister in Glasgow.

== Selected publications ==
- "Spherical Geometry." Proceedings of the Edinburgh Mathematical Society 2 (1883): 8–16. doi:10.1017/S0013091500037020
- with A. Y. Fraser: "La Tour d'Hanoï." Proceedings of the Edinburgh Mathematical Society 2 (1883): 50–53. doi:10.1017/S0013091500037147
- "Radical Axes in Spherical Geometry." Proceedings of the Edinburgh Mathematical Society 3 (1884): 59–61. doi:10.1017/S0013091500037305
- "On a number of concurrent spheres." Proceedings of the Edinburgh Mathematical Society 3 (1884): 118. doi:10.1017/S0013091500037457
- "Projective Geometry of the Sphere." Proceedings of the Edinburgh Mathematical Society 4 (1885): 56–58. doi:10.1017/S0013091500029916
- "Note on a Formula in Quaternions." Proceedings of the Edinburgh Mathematical Society 7 (1888): 8–10. doi:10.1017/S001309150003025X
- "On some theorems in the theory of numbers." Proceedings of the Edinburgh Mathematical Society 8 (1889): 16–19. doi:10.1017/S0013091500030467
- "Some Geometrical Theorems." Proceedings of the Edinburgh Mathematical Society 9 (1890): 11–13. doi:10.1017/S0013091500030716
- "Note on the dual of a focal property of the inscribed ellipse." The Annals of Mathematics 2, no. 1/4 (1900): 148–150. doi:10.2307/2007193
- "On Some Curves Connected with a System of Similar Conics." The Annals of Mathematics 3, no. 1/4 (1901): 154–160. doi:10.2307/1967641
- "On some systems of conics connected with the triangle." Proceedings of the Edinburgh Mathematical Society 20 (1901): 40–43. doi:10.1017/S0013091500032843
- "On a Linear Transformation, and Some Systems of Hypocycloids." The Annals of Mathematics 5, no. 4 (1904): 169–172. doi:10.2307/2007262
- "On a limit of the roots of an equation that is independent of all but two of the coefficients." Bulletin of the American Mathematical Society 13, no. 9 (1907): 443–447. doi:10.1090/S0002-9904-1907-01498-2
- "On the Locus of the Foci of a System of Similar Conics through three Points." Proceedings of the Edinburgh Mathematical Society 27 (1909): 37–50. doi:10.1017/S0013091500002145
