= Exsecant =

Trigonometric function defined as secant minus one

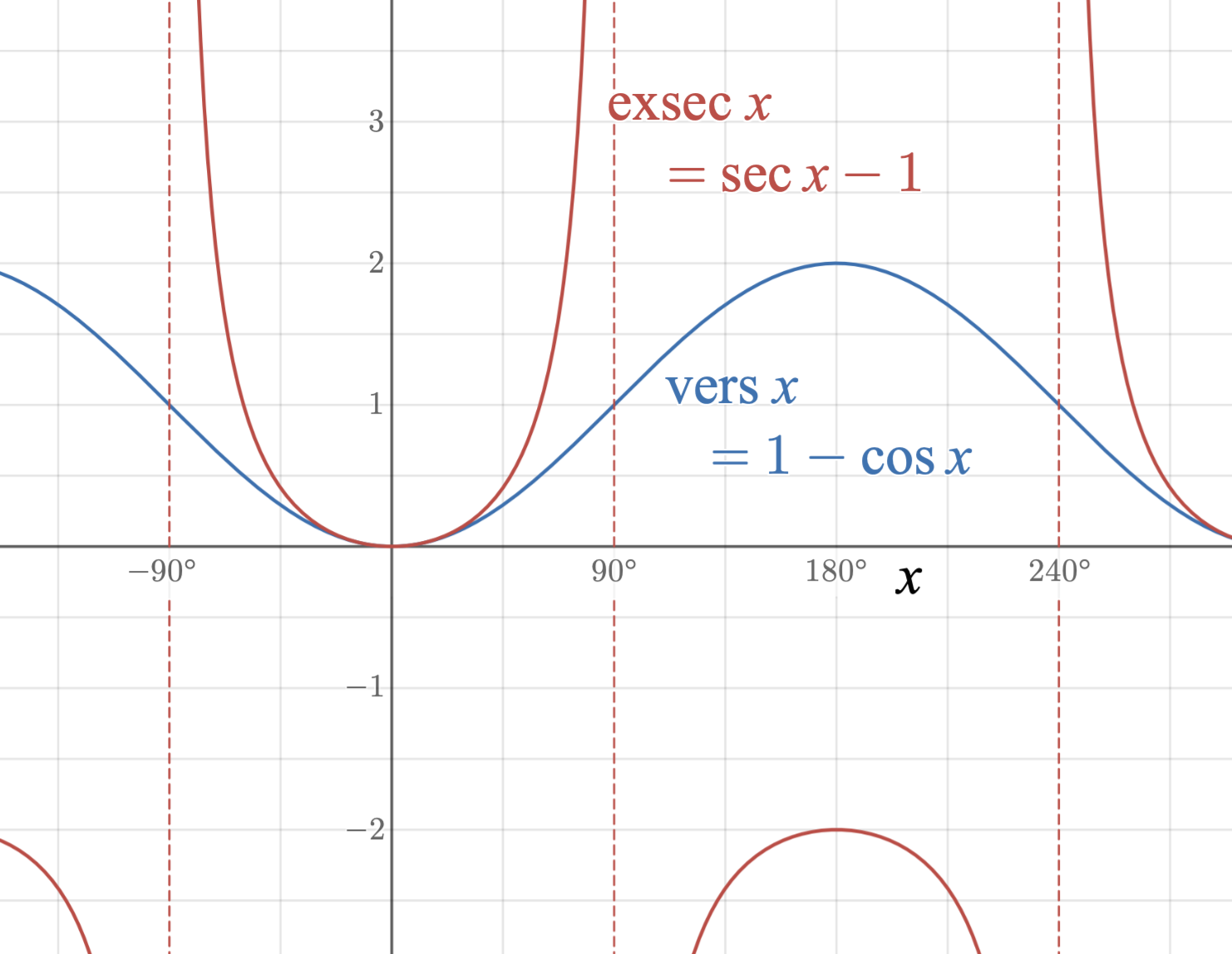
The exsecant and versine functions substitute for the expressions exsec x = sec x − 1 and vers x = 1 − cos x which appear frequently in certain applications.

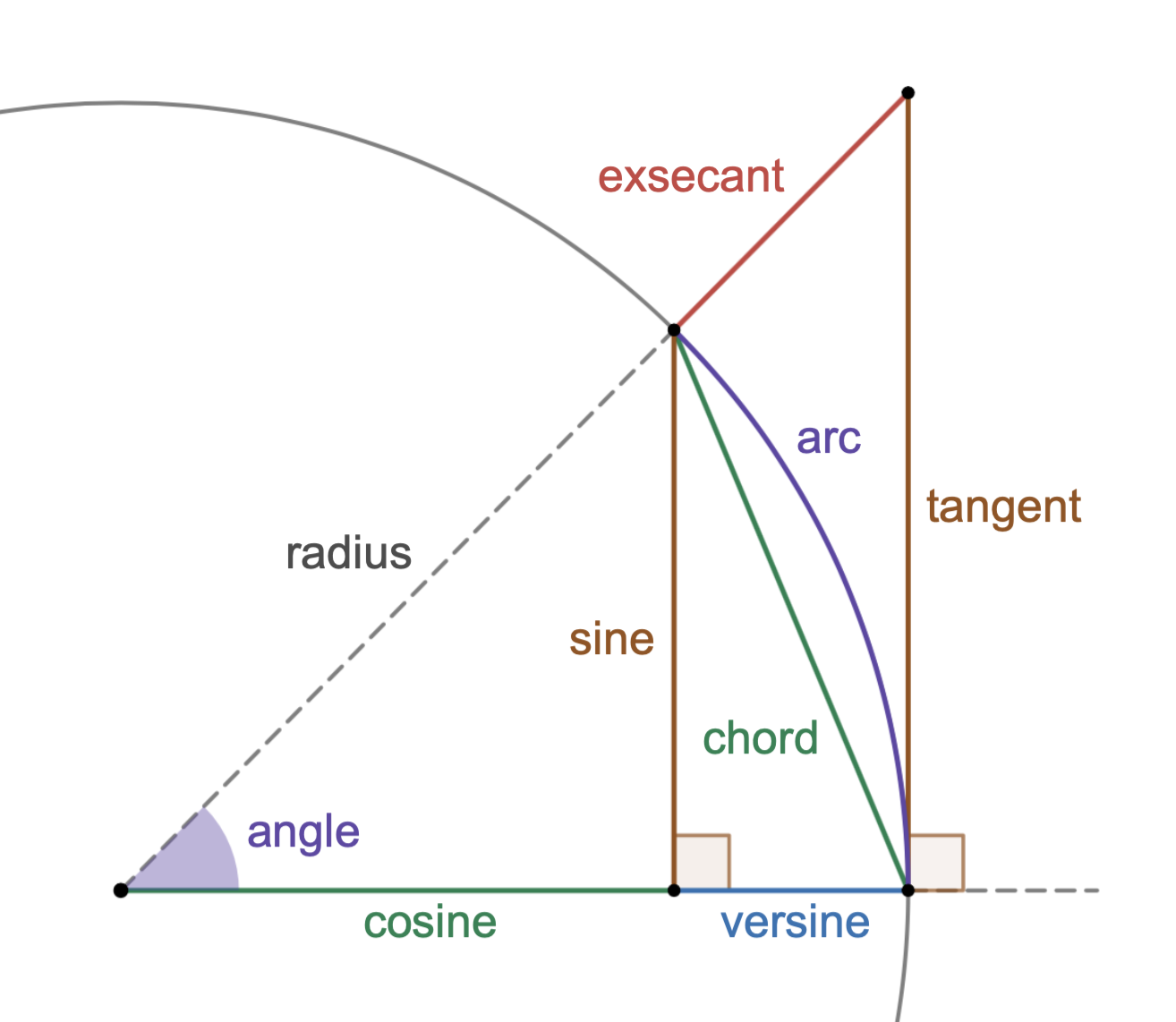
The names exsecant, versine, chord, etc. can also be applied to line segments related to a circular arc. The length of each segment is the radius times the corresponding trigonometric function of the angle.

The external secant function (abbreviated exsecant, symbolized exsec) is a trigonometric function defined in terms of the secant function:
$$\operatorname{exsec} \theta = \sec\theta - 1 = \frac{1}{\cos\theta} - 1.$$

It was introduced in 1855 by American civil engineer Charles Haslett, who used it in conjunction with the existing versine function, $\operatorname{vers}\theta = 1 - \cos\theta$, for designing and measuring circular sections of railroad track. It was adopted by surveyors and civil engineers in the United States for railroad and road design, and since the early 20th century has sometimes been briefly mentioned in American trigonometry textbooks and general-purpose engineering manuals. For completeness, a few books also defined a coexsecant or excosecant function (symbolized coexsec or excsc), $\operatorname{coexsec} \theta = {}$$\csc\theta - 1$, the exsecant of the complementary angle, though it was not used in practice. While the exsecant has occasionally found other applications, today it is obscure and mainly of historical interest.

As a line segment, an external secant of a circle has one endpoint on the circumference, and then extends radially outward. The length of this segment is the radius of the circle times the trigonometric exsecant of the central angle between the segment's inner endpoint and the point of tangency for a line through the outer endpoint and tangent to the circle.

== Etymology ==
The word secant comes from Latin for "to cut", and a general secant line "cuts" a circle, intersecting it twice; this concept dates to antiquity and can be found in Book 3 of Euclid's Elements, as used e.g. in the intersecting secants theorem. 18th century sources in Latin called any non-tangential line segment external to a circle with one endpoint on the circumference a secans exterior.

The trigonometric secant, named by Thomas Fincke (1583), is more specifically based on a line segment with one endpoint at the center of a circle and the other endpoint outside the circle; the circle divides this segment into a radius and an external secant. The external secant segment was used by Galileo Galilei (1632) under the name secant.

== History and applications ==
In the 19th century, most railroad tracks were constructed out of arcs of circles, called simple curves. Surveyors and civil engineers working for the railroad needed to make many repetitive trigonometrical calculations to measure and plan circular sections of track. In surveying, and more generally in practical geometry, tables of both "natural" trigonometric functions and their common logarithms were used, depending on the specific calculation. Using logarithms converts expensive multiplication of multi-digit numbers to cheaper addition, and logarithmic versions of trigonometric tables further saved labor by reducing the number of necessary table lookups.

The external secant or external distance of a curved track section is the shortest distance between the track and the intersection of the tangent lines from the ends of the arc, which equals the radius times the trigonometric exsecant of half the central angle subtended by the arc, $R\operatorname{exsec}\tfrac12\Delta$. By comparison, the versed sine of a curved track section is the furthest distance from the long chord (the line segment between endpoints) to the track – cf. Sagitta – which equals the radius times the trigonometric versine of half the central angle, $R\operatorname{vers}\tfrac12\Delta$. These are both natural quantities to measure or calculate when surveying circular arcs, which must subsequently be multiplied or divided by other quantities. Charles Haslett (1855) found that directly looking up the logarithm of the exsecant and versine saved significant effort and produced more accurate results compared to calculating the same quantity from values found in previously available trigonometric tables. The same idea was adopted by other authors, such as Searles (1880). By 1913 Haslett's approach was so widely adopted in the American railroad industry that, in that context, "tables of external secants and versed sines [were] more common than [were] tables of secants".

In the late-19th and 20th century, railroads began using arcs of an Euler spiral as a track transition curve between straight or circular sections of differing curvature. These spiral curves can be approximately calculated using exsecants and versines.

Solving the same types of problems is required when surveying circular sections of canals and roads, and the exsecant was still used in mid-20th century books about road surveying.

The exsecant has sometimes been used for other applications, such as beam theory and depth sounding with a wire.

In recent years, the availability of calculators and computers has removed the need for trigonometric tables of specialized functions such as this one. Exsecant is generally not directly built into calculators or computing environments (though it has sometimes been included in software libraries), and calculations in general are much cheaper than in the past, no longer requiring tedious manual labor.

== Catastrophic cancellation for small angles ==
Naïvely evaluating the expressions $1 - \cos \theta$ (versine) and $\sec \theta - 1$ (exsecant) is problematic for small angles where $\sec \theta \approx \cos \theta \approx 1$. Computing the difference between two approximately equal quantities results in catastrophic cancellation: because most of the digits of each quantity are the same, they cancel in the subtraction, yielding a lower-precision result.

For example, the secant of 1° is approximately 1.000152, with the leading several digits wasted on zeros, while the common logarithm of the exsecant of 1° is approximately −3.817220, all of whose digits are meaningful. If the logarithm of exsecant is calculated by looking up the secant in a six-place trigonometric table and then subtracting 1, the difference sec 1° − 1 ≈ 0.000152 has only 3 significant digits, and after computing the logarithm only three digits are correct, log(sec 1° − 1) ≈ −3.818156. For even smaller angles loss of precision is worse.

If a table or computer implementation of the exsecant function is not available, the exsecant can be accurately computed as $\operatorname{exsec} \theta = \tan \theta \, \tan \tfrac12\theta$, or, using versine, $\operatorname{exsec} \theta = \operatorname{vers} \theta \, \sec \theta$, which can itself be computed as $\textstyle \operatorname{vers} \theta = 2 \bigl({\sin \tfrac12\theta}\bigr)\vphantom)^2 = {}$$\sin \theta \, \tan \tfrac12\theta$; Haslett used these identities to compute his 1855 exsecant and versine tables.

For a sufficiently small angle, a circular arc is approximately shaped like a parabola, and the versine and exsecant are approximately equal to each-other and both proportional to the square of the arclength.

== Mathematical identities ==
=== Inverse function ===
The inverse of the exsecant function, which might be symbolized arcexsec, is well defined if its argument $y \geq 0$ or $y \leq -2$ and can be expressed in terms of other inverse trigonometric functions (using radians for the angle):
$$\operatorname{arcexsec}y = \arcsec(y+1) = \begin{cases}
{\arctan}\bigl(\!{\textstyle \sqrt{y^2+2y}}~\!\bigr) & \text{if}\ \ y \geq 0, \\[6mu]
\text{undefined} & \text{if}\ \ {-2} < y < 0, \\[4mu]
\pi - {\arctan}\bigl(\!{\textstyle \sqrt{y^2+2y}}~\!\bigr) & \text{if}\ \ y \leq {-2}; \\
\end{cases}_{\vphantom.}$$
the arctangent expression is well behaved for small angles.

=== Calculus ===
While historical uses of the exsecant did not explicitly involve calculus, its derivative and antiderivative (for x in radians) are:
$$\begin{align}
\frac{\mathrm{d}}{\mathrm{d}x}\operatorname{exsec} x &= \tan x\,\sec x, \\[10mu]
\int\operatorname{exsec} x\,\mathrm{d}x &= \ln\bigl|{\sec x + \tan x}\bigr| - x + C,\vphantom{\int_|}
\end{align}$$
where ln is the natural logarithm. See also Integral of the secant function.

=== Double angle identity ===
The exsecant of twice an angle is:
$$\operatorname{exsec} 2\theta = \frac{2 \sin^2 \theta} {1 - 2 \sin^2 \theta}.$$

== See also ==
- Chord (geometry) – A line segment with endpoints on the circumference of a circle, historically used trigonometrically
- Exponential minus 1 – The function $x \mapsto e^x - 1$, also used to improve precision for small inputs
