= Tangent lines to circles =

Line which touches a circle at exactly one point

In Euclidean plane geometry, a tangent line to a circle is a line that touches the circle at exactly one point, never entering the circle's interior. Tangent lines to circles form the subject of several theorems, and play an important role in many geometrical constructions and proofs. Since the tangent line to a circle at a point P is perpendicular to the radius to that point, theorems involving tangent lines often involve radial lines and orthogonal circles.

== Tangent lines to one circle ==
Certain lines and line segments relative to a circle

Any line in the plane can be classified, with respect to a given circle C, as either a secant line, which intersects the circle in two points, a tangent line, which intersects the circle in a single point, or a line entirely exterior to the circle which does not intersect it at all. A chord is the portion of a secant line between the two intersections with the circle. An axis of the circle is a secant line passing through the circle's center, and the corresponding chord is a diameter. A radius is half of a diameter, a line segment from any point on the circle to the circle's center.

Every tangent line to a circle is perpendicular to the radius at their point of intersection, known as the point of tangency. Conversely, every radius is perpendicular to a specific tangent line at their point of intersection. The resulting geometrical figure of circle and tangent line has a reflection symmetry about the axis of the radius.

The property that a tangent line intersects the circle in a single point is preserved under shape-preserving geometrical transformations of the plane, such as scalings, rotation, translations.

Two Tangents Theorem

Two Tangents Theorem In $\triangle PT_1O$ and $\triangle PT_2O$, $$\begin{aligned} \angle PT_1O = \angle PT_2O = 90^\circ\\ |PO| = |PO|~(hypotenuse)\\ |OT_1| = |OT_2| = r\\ \therefore \triangle PT_1O \cong \triangle PT_2O\\(RHS~congruency)\\ \therefore |PT_1| = |PT_2| \end{aligned}$$

Two tangent lines can be drawn to a circle from a point P outside of the circle. The geometric figure of a circle and both tangent lines has a reflection symmetry about the radial axis joining P to the center O of the circle. Thus , the lengths of the line segments from P to the two tangent points T_{1} and T_{2} are equal. This is sometimes called the Two Tangents Theorem, see Incircle). Also, the angle at point P and the angle at point O are supplementary (sum to 180°).

Tangent-Secant Theorem

Tangent-Secant Theorem The product of lengths P̅M̅ and P̅N̅ for any secant PMN equals the square of the length of the tangent line segment P̅T̅ (red).

Instead of two tangent lines being drawn to a circle from a point P outside of the circle, a single tangent line and a secant line can be drawn through point P. By the tangent-secant theorem, the square of the tangent length PT equals the product of the lengths of the two line segments extending from point P to each of the intersection points M and N of the secant with the circle.

$|PT|^2=|PM|\cdot|PN|$

The tangent-secant theorem is a special case of the broader power of a point theorem introduced in 1826. This power equals the product of distances from P to any two intersection points of the circle with a secant line passing through P.

The tangent line t and the tangent point T have a conjugate relationship to one another, which has been generalized into the idea of pole points and polar lines. The same reciprocal relation exists between a point P outside the circle and the secant line joining its two points of tangency.

Tangent-Chord Theorem

Tangent-Chord Theorem (Alternate Segment Angle Theorem) The angle between a chord and a tangent is half the measure of the central angle of the chord. Also, it is equal in measure to the inscribed angle of the chord in the alternate segment

By the tangent-chord theorem, if a chord TM is drawn from the tangency point T of exterior point P and ∠PTM ≤ 90° then ∠PTM = ½ ∠TOM.

=== Cartesian equation ===
Suppose that the equation of the circle in Cartesian coordinates is $(x-a)^2+(y-b)^2=r^2$ with center at (a, b). Then the tangent line of the circle at (x_{1}, y_{1}) has Cartesian equation

$$(x-x_1)(x_1-a)+(y-y_1)(y_1-b)=0$$

This can be proved by taking the implicit derivative of the circle. Say that the circle has equation of $(x-a)^2+(y-b)^2=r^2,$ and we are finding the slope of tangent line at (x_{1}, y_{1}) where $(x_1-a)^2+(y_1-b)^2=r^2.$ We begin by taking the implicit derivative with respect to x:

$$\begin{align}
(x-a)^2 + (y-b)^2 &= r^2 \\[4pt]
2(x-a) + 2(y-b)\frac{dy}{dx} &= 0 \\[2pt]
\frac{dy}{dx} &= -\frac{x_1-a}{y_1-b}
\end{align}$$

Now that we have the slope of the tangent line, we can substitute the slope and the coordinate of the tangency point into the line equation y = kx + m.

$$\begin{align}
y &= -\frac{x_1-a}{y_1-b}x + y_1 + x_1 \frac{x_1-a}{y_1-b} \\
y - y_1 &= (x_1-x)\frac{x_1-a}{y_1-b} \\[2pt]
(y-y_1)(y_1-b) &= -(x-x_1)(x_1-a) \\[8pt]
(x-x_1)(x_1-a)+(y-y_1)(y_1-b) &= 0
\end{align}$$

=== Compass and straightedge constructions ===
It is relatively straightforward to construct a line t tangent to a circle at a point T on the circumference of the circle:

- A line a is drawn from O, the center of the circle, through the radial point T;
- The line t is the perpendicular line to a.

Construction of tangent lines to a circle (C) from a given exterior point (P).

Thales' theorem may be used to construct the tangent lines to a point P external to the circle C:

- A circle is drawn centered on the midpoint M of the line segment O̅P̅ and having radius M̅O̅ (cyan).
- The intersection points T_{1} and T_{2} of the circle C and the new circle are the tangent points for lines passing through P, by the following argument (tan).

The line segments O̅T̅_{1} and O̅T̅_{2} are radii of the circle C; since both are inscribed in a semicircle, they are perpendicular to the line segments P̅T̅_{1} and P̅T̅_{2}, respectively. But only a tangent line is perpendicular to the radial line. Hence, the two lines from P and passing through T_{1} and T_{2} are tangent to the circle C.

Another method to construct the tangent lines to a point P external to the circle using only a straightedge:

- Draw any three different lines through the given point P that intersect the circle twice.
- Let A_{1}, A_{2}, B_{1}, B_{2}, C_{1}, C_{2} be the six intersection points, with the same letter corresponding to the same line and the index 1 corresponding to the point closer to P.
- Let D be the point where the lines A_{1}B_{2} and A_{2}B_{1} intersect,
- Similarly E for the lines B_{1}C_{2} and B_{2}C_{1}.
- Draw a line through D and E.
- This line meets the circle at two points, F and G.
- The tangents are the lines PF and PG.

=== With analytic geometry ===
Let $P=(a,b)$ be a point of the circle with equation $x^2+y^2=r^2.$ The tangent at P has equation $ax+by=r^2,$ because P lies on both the curves and $\vec{OP}=(a,b)^T$ is a normal vector of the line. The tangent intersects the x-axis at point $P_0=(x_0,0)$ with $ax_0=r^2.$

Tangents through a point

Conversely, if one starts with point $P_0=(x_0,0),$ then the two tangents through P_{0} meet the circle at the two points $P_{1/2}=(a,b_\pm)$ with
$$a=\frac{r^2}{x_0},\qquad b_\pm=\pm\sqrt{r^2-a^2}=\pm\frac{r}{x_0}\sqrt{x_0^2-r^2}.$$
Written in vector form:
$$\binom{a}{b_\pm}=\frac{r^2}{x_0} \binom 1 0 \pm \frac{r}{x_0}\sqrt{x_0^2-r^2} \binom 0 1 \ .$$

If point $P_0=(x_0,y_0)$ lies not on the x-axis: In the vector form one replaces x_{0} by the distance $d_0=\sqrt{x_0^2+y_0^2}$ and the unit base vectors by the orthogonal unit vectors $\vec e_1 = \frac{1}{d_0} \binom{x_0}{y_0}, \ \vec e_2=\frac{1}{d_0}\binom{-y_0}{x_0}.$ Then the tangents through point P_{0} touch the circle at the points
$$\binom{x_{1/2}}{y_{1/2}} = \frac{r^2}{d_0^2}\binom{x_0}{y_0} \pm\frac{r}{d_0^2}\sqrt{d_0^2-r^2}\binom{-y_0}{x_0}.$$

- For d_{0} < r no tangents exist.
- For d_{0} = r point P_{0} lies on the circle and there is just one tangent with equation $x_0x+y_0y=r^2.$
- In case of d_{0} > r there are 2 tangents with equations $x_1x+y_1 y=r^2,\ x_2x+y_2y=r^2.$

Relation to circle inversion: Equation $ax_0=r^2$ describes the circle inversion of point $(x_0,0).$

Relation to pole and polar: The polar of point $(x_0,0)$ has equation $xx_0=r^2.$

=== Tangential polygons ===
A tangential polygon is a polygon each of whose sides is tangent to a particular circle, called its incircle. Every triangle is a tangential polygon, as is every regular polygon of any number of sides; in addition, for every number of polygon sides there are an infinite number of non-congruent tangential polygons.

==== Tangent quadrilateral theorem and inscribed circles ====
A tangential quadrilateral ABCD is a closed figure of four straight sides that are tangent to a given circle C. Equivalently, the circle C is inscribed in the quadrilateral ABCD. By the Pitot theorem, the sums of opposite sides of any such quadrilateral are equal, i.e.,

$$\overline{AB} + \overline{CD} = \overline{BC} + \overline{DA}.$$

Tangential quadrilateral

This conclusion follows from the equality of the tangent segments from the four vertices of the quadrilateral. Let the tangent points be denoted as P (on segment A̅B̅), Q (on segment B̅C̅), R (on segment C̅D̅) and S (on segment D̅A̅). The symmetric tangent segments about each point of ABCD are equal:
$$\begin{align}
\overline{BP} = \overline{BQ} = b, &\quad \overline{CQ} = \overline{CR} = c, \\
\overline{DR} = \overline{DS} = d, &\quad \overline{AS} = \overline{AP} = a.
\end{align}$$
But each side of the quadrilateral is composed of two such tangent segments

$$\begin{align}
& \overline{AB} + \overline{CD} = (a+b) + (c+d) \\
={} & \overline{BC} + \overline{DA} = (b+c) + (d+a)
\end{align}$$

proving the theorem.

The converse is also true: a circle can be inscribed into every quadrilateral in which the lengths of opposite sides sum to the same value.

This theorem and its converse have various uses. For example, they show immediately that no rectangle can have an inscribed circle unless it is a square, and that every rhombus has an inscribed circle, whereas a general parallelogram does not.

== Tangent lines to two circles ==
The external (above) and internal (below) homothetic center S of the two circles.

For two circles, there are generally four distinct lines that are tangent to both (bitangent) – if the two circles are outside each other – but in degenerate cases there may be any number between zero and four bitangent lines; these are addressed below. For two of these, the external tangent lines, the circles fall on the same side of the line; for the two others, the internal tangent lines, the circles fall on opposite sides of the line. The external tangent lines intersect in the external homothetic center, whereas the internal tangent lines intersect at the internal homothetic center. Both the external and internal homothetic centers lie on the line of centers (the line connecting the centers of the two circles), closer to the center of the smaller circle: the internal center is in the segment between the two circles, while the external center is not between the points, but rather outside, on the side of the center of the smaller circle. If the two circles have equal radius, there are still four bitangents, but the external tangent lines are parallel and there is no external center in the affine plane; in the projective plane, the external homothetic center lies at the point at infinity corresponding to the slope of these lines.

=== Outer tangent ===
Finding outer tangent. Two circles' outer tangents

The red line joining the points (x_{3}, y_{3}) and (x_{4}, y_{4}) is the outer tangent between the two circles. Given points (x_{1}, y_{1}), (x_{2}, y_{2}) the points (x_{3}, y_{3}), (x_{4}, y_{4}) can easily be calculated with help of the angle α:

$$\begin{align}
x_3 &=x_1 \pm r\sin \alpha\\
y_3 &=y_1 \pm r\cos \alpha\\
x_4 &=x_2 \pm R\sin \alpha\\
y_4 &=y_2 \pm R\cos \alpha\\
\end{align}$$

Here R and r notate the radii of the two circles and the angle α can be computed using basic trigonometry. You have α = γ − β with
$$\begin{align}
\gamma &= -\text{atan2}\left({y_2-y_1},{x_2-x_1}\right) \\[2pt]
\beta &= \mp \arcsin\left(\frac{R-r}{\sqrt{(x_2-x_1)^2+(y_2-y_1)^2}}\right)
\end{align}$$
where atan2 is the 2-argument arctangent.

Outer tangents to two circles

The distances between the centers of the nearer and farther circles, O_{2} and O_{1} and the point where the two outer tangents of the two circles intersect (homothetic center), S respectively can be found out using similarity as follows:
$$\frac{dr}{r_1-r_2}$$
Here, r can be r_{1} or r_{2} depending upon the need to find distances from the centers of the nearer or farther circle, O_{2} and O_{1}. d is the distance O_{1}O_{2} between the centers of two circles.

=== Inner tangent ===
Inner tangent. The external tangent lines pass through the internal homothetic center.

An inner tangent is a tangent that intersects the segment joining two circles' centers. Note that the inner tangent will not be defined for cases when the two circles overlap.

=== Construction ===
The bitangent lines can be constructed either by constructing the homothetic centers, as described at that article, and then constructing the tangent lines through the homothetic center that is tangent to one circle, by one of the methods described above. The resulting line will then be tangent to the other circle as well. Alternatively, the tangent lines and tangent points can be constructed more directly, as detailed below. Note that in degenerate cases these constructions break down; to simplify exposition this is not discussed in this section, but a form of the construction can work in limit cases (e.g., two circles tangent at one point).

==== Synthetic geometry ====
Let O_{1} and O_{2} be the centers of the two circles, C_{1} and C_{2} and let r_{1} and r_{2} be their radii, with r_{1} > r_{2}; in other words, circle C_{1} is defined as the larger of the two circles. Two different methods may be used to construct the external and internal tangent lines.

External tangents

Construction of the outer tangent

A new circle C_{3} of radius r_{1} − r_{2} is drawn centered on O_{1}. Using the method above, two lines are drawn from O_{2} that are tangent to this new circle. These lines are parallel to the desired tangent lines, because the situation corresponds to shrinking both circles C_{1} and C_{2} by a constant amount, r_{2}, which shrinks C_{2} to a point. Two radial lines may be drawn from the center O_{1} through the tangent points on C_{3}; these intersect C_{1} at the desired tangent points. The desired external tangent lines are the lines perpendicular to these radial lines at those tangent points, which may be constructed as described above.

Internal tangents

Construction of the inner tangent

A new circle C_{3} of radius r_{1} + r_{2} is drawn centered on O_{1}. Using the method above, two lines are drawn from O_{2} that are tangent to this new circle. These lines are parallel to the desired tangent lines, because the situation corresponds to shrinking C_{2} to a point while expanding C_{1} by a constant amount, r_{2}. Two radial lines may be drawn from the center O_{1} through the tangent points on C_{3}; these intersect C_{1} at the desired tangent points. The desired internal tangent lines are the lines perpendicular to these radial lines at those tangent points, which may be constructed as described above.

==== Analytic geometry ====
Let the circles have centres c_{1} = (x_{1}, y_{1}) and c_{2} = (x_{2}, y_{2}) with radius r_{1} and r_{2} respectively. Expressing a line by the equation $ax + by + c = 0,$ with the normalization $a^2 + b^2 = 1,$ then a bitangent line satisfies:
$$\begin{align}
ax_1 + by_1 + c &=  r_1 \\
ax_2 + by_2 + c &=  r_2 \\
\end{align}$$
Solving for (a, b, c) by subtracting the first from the second yields
$$a\Delta x + b\Delta y = \Delta r,\qquad (1)$$
where
$$\Delta x = x_2 - x_1, \quad \Delta y = y_2 - y_1$$
and
$$\Delta r = r_2 - r_1$$
for the outer tangent or
$$\Delta r = r_2 + r_1$$
for the inner tangent.

If $d = \sqrt{(\Delta x)^2 + (\Delta y)^2}$ is the distance from c_{1} to c_{2} we can normalize by
$$X = \frac{\Delta x}{d}, \quad Y = \frac{\Delta y}{d}, \quad R = \frac{\Delta r}{d}$$
to simplify equation (1), resulting in the following system of equations:
$$\begin{align}
aX + bY &= R, \\
a^2 + b^2 &= 1;
\end{align}$$
solve these to get two solutions (k = ±1; $k = -1$ for left tangent, $k = +1$ for right tangent) for the two tangent lines ($m=-1$ for outer tangent, $m = +1$ for inner tangent):
$$\begin{align}
a &= RX - kY\sqrt{1 - R^2} \\
b &= RY + kX\sqrt{1 - R^2} \\
c &= -m \cdot r_1 - (ax_1 + by_1)
\end{align}$$
Geometrically this corresponds to computing the angle formed by the tangent lines and the line of centers, and then using that to rotate the equation for the line of centers to yield an equation for the tangent line. The angle is computed by computing the trigonometric functions of a right triangle whose vertices are the (external) homothetic center, a center of a circle, and a tangent point; the hypotenuse lies on the tangent line, the radius is opposite the angle, and the adjacent side lies on the line of centers.

(X, Y) is the unit vector pointing from c_{1} to c_{2}, while R is cos θ where θ is the angle between the line of centers and a tangent line. sin θ is then $\pm \sqrt{1-R^2}$ (depending on the sign of θ, equivalently the direction of rotation), and the above equations are rotation of (X, Y) by ±θ using the rotation matrix:
$$\begin{pmatrix}
R & \mp\sqrt{1-R^2}\\
\pm \sqrt{1-R^2} & R
\end{pmatrix}$$

- k = 1 is the tangent line to the right of the circles looking from c_{1} to c_{2}.
- k = −1 is the tangent line to the right of the circles looking from c_{2} to c_{1}.

The above assumes each circle has positive radius. If r_{1} is positive and r_{2} negative then c_{1} will lie to the left of each line and c_{2} to the right, and the two tangent lines will cross. In this way all four solutions are obtained. Switching signs of both radii switches k = 1 and k = −1.

==== Vectors ====
Finding outer tangent. Circle tangents.

In general the points of tangency t_{1} and t_{2} for the four lines tangent to two circles with centers v_{1} and v_{2} and radii r_{1} and r_{2} are given by solving the simultaneous equations:

$$\begin{align}
(t_2 - v_2)\cdot(t_2 - t_1) & = 0 \\
(t_1 - v_1)\cdot(t_2 - t_1) & = 0 \\
(t_1 - v_1)\cdot(t_1 - v_1) & = r_1^2 \\
(t_2 - v_2)\cdot(t_2 - v_2) & = r_2^2 \\
\end{align}$$

These equations express that the tangent line, which is parallel to $t_2 - t_1,$ is perpendicular to the radii, and that the tangent points lie on their respective circles.

These are four quadratic equations in two two-dimensional vector variables, and in general position will have four pairs of solutions.

=== Degenerate cases ===
Two distinct circles may have between zero and four bitangent lines, depending on configuration; these can be classified in terms of the distance between the centers and the radii. If counted with multiplicity (counting a common tangent twice) there are zero, two, or four bitangent lines. Bitangent lines can also be generalized to circles with negative or zero radius. The degenerate cases and the multiplicities can also be understood in terms of limits of other configurations – e.g., a limit of two circles that almost touch, and moving one so that they touch, or a circle with small radius shrinking to a circle of zero radius.

- If the circles are outside each other ($d > r_1 + r_2$), which is general position, there are four bitangents.
- If they touch externally at one point ($d = r_1 + r_2$) – have one point of external tangency – then they have two external bitangents and one internal bitangent, namely the common tangent line. This common tangent line has multiplicity two, as it separates the circles (one on the left, one on the right) for either orientation (direction).
- If the circles intersect in two points ($|r_1 - r_2| < d < r_1 + r_2$), then they have no internal bitangents and two external bitangents (they cannot be separated, because they intersect, hence no internal bitangents).
- If the circles touch internally at one point ($d = |r_1 - r_2|$) – have one point of internal tangency – then they have no internal bitangents and one external bitangent, namely the common tangent line, which has multiplicity two, as above.
- If one circle is completely inside the other ($d < |r_1 - r_2|$) then they have no bitangents, as a tangent line to the outer circle does not intersect the inner circle, or conversely a tangent line to the inner circle is a secant line to the outer circle.

Finally, if the two circles are identical, any tangent to the circle is a common tangent and hence (external) bitangent, so there is a circle's worth of bitangents.

Further, the notion of bitangent lines can be extended to circles with negative radius (the same locus of points, $x^2 + y^2 = (-r)^2,$ but considered "inside out"), in which case if the radii have opposite sign (one circle has negative radius and the other has positive radius) the external and internal homothetic centers and external and internal bitangents are switched, while if the radii have the same sign (both positive radii or both negative radii) "external" and "internal" have the same usual sense (switching one sign switches them, so switching both switches them back).

Bitangent lines can also be defined when one or both of the circles has radius zero. In this case the circle with radius zero is a double point, and thus any line passing through it intersects the point with multiplicity two, hence is "tangent". If one circle has radius zero, a bitangent line is simply a line tangent to the circle and passing through the point, and is counted with multiplicity two. If both circles have radius zero, then the bitangent line is the line they define, and is counted with multiplicity four.

Note that in these degenerate cases the external and internal homothetic center do generally still exist (the external center is at infinity if the radii are equal), except if the circles coincide, in which case the external center is not defined, or if both circles have radius zero, in which case the internal center is not defined.

=== Applications ===
==== Belt problem ====
The internal and external tangent lines are useful in solving the belt problem, which is to calculate the length of a belt or rope needed to fit snugly over two pulleys. If the belt is considered to be a mathematical line of negligible thickness, and if both pulleys are assumed to lie in exactly the same plane, the problem devolves to summing the lengths of the relevant tangent line segments with the lengths of circular arcs subtended by the belt. If the belt is wrapped about the wheels so as to cross, the interior tangent line segments are relevant. Conversely, if the belt is wrapped exteriorly around the pulleys, the exterior tangent line segments are relevant; this case is sometimes called the pulley problem.

== Tangent lines to three circles: Monge's theorem ==
For three circles denoted by C_{1}, C_{2}, and C_{3}, there are three pairs of circles (C_{1}C_{2}, C_{2}C_{3}, and C_{1}C_{3}). Since each pair of circles has two homothetic centers, there are six homothetic centers altogether. Gaspard Monge showed in the early 19th century that these six points lie on four lines, each line having three collinear points.

== Problem of Apollonius ==
Animation showing the inversive transformation of an Apollonius problem. The blue and red circles swell to tangency, and are inverted in the grey circle, producing two straight lines. The yellow solutions are found by sliding a circle between them until it touches the transformed green circle from within or without.

Many special cases of Apollonius's problem involve finding a circle that is tangent to one or more lines. The simplest of these is to construct circles that are tangent to three given lines (the LLL problem). To solve this problem, the center of any such circle must lie on an angle bisector of any pair of the lines; there are two angle-bisecting lines for every intersection of two lines. The intersections of these angle bisectors give the centers of solution circles. There are four such circles in general, the inscribed circle of the triangle formed by the intersection of the three lines, and the three exscribed circles.

A general Apollonius problem can be transformed into the simpler problem of circle tangent to one circle and two parallel lines (itself a special case of the LLC special case). To accomplish this, it suffices to scale two of the three given circles until they just touch, i.e., are tangent. An inversion in their tangent point with respect to a circle of appropriate radius transforms the two touching given circles into two parallel lines, and the third given circle into another circle. Thus, the solutions may be found by sliding a circle of constant radius between two parallel lines until it contacts the transformed third circle. Re-inversion produces the corresponding solutions to the original problem.

== Generalizations ==
The concept of a tangent line and tangent point can be generalized to a pole point Q and its corresponding polar line q. The points P and Q are inverses of each other with respect to the circle.

The concept of a tangent line to one or more circles can be generalized in several ways. First, the conjugate relationship between tangent points and tangent lines can be generalized to pole points and polar lines, in which the pole points may be anywhere, not only on the circumference of the circle. Second, the union of two circles is a special (reducible) case of a quartic plane curve, and the external and internal tangent lines are the bitangents to this quartic curve. A generic quartic curve has 28 bitangents.

A third generalization considers tangent circles, rather than tangent lines; a tangent line can be considered as a tangent circle of infinite radius. In particular, the external tangent lines to two circles are limiting cases of a family of circles which are internally or externally tangent to both circles, while the internal tangent lines are limiting cases of a family of circles which are internally tangent to one and externally tangent to the other of the two circles.

In Möbius or inversive geometry, lines are viewed as circles through a point "at infinity" and for any line and any circle, there is a Möbius transformation which maps one to the other. In Möbius geometry, tangency between a line and a circle becomes a special case of tangency between two circles. This equivalence is extended further in Lie sphere geometry.

Radius and tangent line are perpendicular at a point of a circle, and hyperbolic-orthogonal at a point of the unit hyperbola. The parametric representation of the unit hyperbola via radius vector is p(a) = (cosh a, sinh a). The derivative of p(a) points in the direction of tangent line at p(a), and is $\tfrac{dp}{da} =(\sinh a, \cosh a).$ The radius and tangent are hyperbolic orthogonal at a since p(a) and $\tfrac{dp}{da}$ are reflections of each other in the asymptote y = x of the unit hyperbola. When interpreted as split-complex numbers (where j j = +1), the two numbers satisfy $j p(a) = \tfrac{dp}{da}.$
