= Intersecting chords theorem =

Geometry theorem relating the line segments created by intersecting chords in a circle

$|AS|\cdot|SC|=|BS|\cdot|SD|$

In Euclidean geometry, the intersecting chords theorem, or just the chord theorem, is a statement that describes a relation of the four line segments created by two intersecting chords within a circle. It states that the products of the lengths of the line segments on each chord are equal. It is Proposition 35 of Book 3 of Euclid's Elements.

For example, for two chords AC and BD intersecting at point S, the following equation holds:
$$|AS|\cdot|SC|=|BS|\cdot|SD|$$

== Proof ==
The theorem can be proven by triangle similarity and the inscribed angle theorem.

$\triangle ASD \sim \triangle BSC$

By the inscribed angle theorem, $\angle BCA=\angle ADB$ and $\angle DAC=\angle CBD$, as each pair intercepts a common chord. Opposite angles at the point $S$ are also congruent, $\angle ASD=\angle BSC$. Therefore $\triangle ASD$ and $\triangle BSC$ are similar triangles, with congruent corresponding angles.

The sides of one triangle are uniformly proportional to the corresponding sides of any similar triangle, so
$$\frac{|AS|}{|BS|}=\frac{|SD|}{|SC|},$$
or, equivalently,
$$|AS|\cdot|SC|=|BS|\cdot|SD|.$$

== Related concepts ==
The converse is true as well. That is: If for two line segments A̅C̅ and B̅D̅ intersecting in S the equation above holds true, then their four endpoints A, B, C, D lie on a common circle. Or in other words, if the diagonals of a quadrilateral ABCD intersect in S and fulfill the equation above, then it is a cyclic quadrilateral.

$$\begin{align} & |AS|\cdot|SC| = |BS|\cdot|SD| \\ ={}& (r+d)\cdot(r-d) = r^2-d^2 \end{align}$$

By applying the chord theorem to a third chord (a diameter) going through the circle's center M and point S, the following relationships can be made:
$$|AS|\cdot|SC| = |BS|\cdot|SD| = r^2-d^2,$$
where r is the radius of the circle and d is the distance between the circle's center M and point S.

Next to the tangent-secant theorem and the intersecting secants theorem, the intersecting chords theorem represents one of the three basic cases of a more general theorem about two intersecting lines and a circle: the power of a point theorem. The distance d from the circle's center M to the intersection point S is the absolute value of the power of S with respect to the circle.
