= Circular segment =

Area bounded by a circular arc and a straight line

A circular segment (in green) is enclosed between a secant/chord (the dashed line) and the arc whose endpoints equal the chord's (the arc shown above the green area).

In geometry, a circular segment or disk segment (symbol: ⌓) is a region of a disk which is "cut off" from the rest of the disk by a straight line. The complete line is known as a secant, and the section inside the disk as a chord.

More formally, a circular segment is a plane region bounded by a circular arc (of less than π radians by convention) and the circular chord connecting its endpoints.

== Formulae ==
Let R be the radius of the arc which forms part of the perimeter of the segment, θ the central angle subtending the arc in radians, c the chord length, s the arc length, h the sagitta (height) of the segment, d the apothem of the segment, and a the area of the segment.

Usually, chord length and height are given or measured, and sometimes the arc length as part of the perimeter, and the unknowns are area and sometimes arc length. These can't be calculated simply from chord length and height, so two intermediate quantities, the radius and central angle are usually calculated first.

=== Radius and central angle ===
The radius is:

$R = \tfrac{h}{2}+\tfrac{c^2}{8h}$

The central angle is

$$\theta = 2\arcsin\tfrac{c}{2R}$$

=== Chord length and height ===
The chord length and height can be back-computed from radius and central angle by:

The chord length is

$$c = 2R\sin\tfrac{\theta}{2} = R\sqrt{2(1-\cos\theta)}$$
$$c = 2\sqrt{R^2 - (R - h)^2} = 2\sqrt{2Rh - h^2}$$

The sagitta is

$$h =R-\sqrt{R^2-\frac{c^2}{4}}= R(1-\cos\tfrac{\theta}{2})=R\left(1-\sqrt{\tfrac{1+\cos\theta}{2}}\right)=\frac{c}{2}\tan\frac{\theta}{4}$$

The apothem is

$$d = R - h = \sqrt{R^2-\frac{c^2}{4}} = R\cos\tfrac{\theta}{2}$$

=== Arc length and area ===
The arc length, from the familiar geometry of a circle, is

$$s = {\theta}R$$

The area $a$ of the circular segment is equal to the area of the circular sector minus the area of the triangular portion (using the double angle formula to get an equation in terms of $\theta$):

$$a = \tfrac{R^2}{2} \left(\theta - \sin \theta\right)$$

In terms of c and R,

$$a = \tfrac{R^2}{2} \left(2\arcsin\tfrac{c}{2R} - \sin\left(2\arcsin\tfrac{c}{2R}\right)\right) = R^2\left(\arcsin\frac{c}{2R} - \frac{c}{2R}\sqrt{1-\left(\frac{c}{2R}\right)^2}\right)$$

In terms of R and h,

$$a = R^2\arccos\left(1-\frac{h}{R}\right) - \left(R-h\right)\sqrt{h\left(2R - h\right)}$$

In terms of c and h,

$$a = \left(\frac{c^2}{8h}+\frac{h}{2}\right)^2\arccos\left(\frac{c^2-4h^2}{c^2+4h^2}\right) - \frac{c}{16h}(c^2-4h^2)$$

What can be stated is that as the central angle gets smaller (or alternately the radius gets larger), the area a rapidly and asymptotically approaches $\tfrac{2}{3}c\cdot h$. If $\theta \ll 1$, $a = \tfrac{2}{3}c\cdot h$ is a substantially good approximation.

If $c$ is held constant, and the radius is allowed to vary, then we have
$$\frac{\partial a}{\partial s} = R$$

As the central angle approaches π, the area of the segment is converging to the area of a semicircle, $\tfrac{\pi R^2}{2}$, so a good approximation is a delta offset from the latter area:

$a\approx \tfrac{\pi R^2}{2}-(R+\tfrac{c}{2})(R-h)$ for h>.75R

As an example, the area is one quarter the circle when θ ~ 2.31 radians (132.3°) corresponding to a height of ~59.6% and a chord length of ~183% of the radius.

=== Other properties ===
The perimeter p is the arclength plus the chord length:

$$p=c+s=c+\theta R$$

Proportion of the whole area of the circle:

$$\frac{a}{A}= \frac{\theta - \sin \theta}{2\pi}$$

== Applications ==
The area formula can be used in calculating the volume of a partially-filled cylindrical tank lying horizontally.

In the design of windows or doors with rounded tops, c and h may be the only known values and can be used to calculate R for the draftsman's compass setting.

One can reconstruct the full dimensions of a complete circular object from fragments by measuring the arc length and the chord length of the fragment.

To check hole positions on a circular pattern. Especially useful for quality checking on machined products.

For calculating the area or locating the centroid of a planar shape that contains circular segments.

== See also ==
- Chord (geometry)
- Spherical cap
- Circular sector
