= Midpoint theorem =

Midpoint theorem may refer to the following mathematical theorems:

- Midpoint theorem (triangle)
- Midpoint theorem (conics)
- Midpoint theorem, describing the properties of medians in a triangle: see Median (triangle)
- Midpoint theorem, also known as Midpoint formula
