= Secant plane =

Animation showing the circular secant planes of the ellipsoid

A secant plane is a plane containing a nontrivial section of a sphere or an ellipsoid, or such a plane that a sphere is projected onto. Secant planes are similar to tangent planes, which contact the sphere's surface at a point, while secant planes contact the surface along curves.

The two-dimensional representations of secant planes are secant lines, the lines that join two distinct points on a curve.

== Applications ==
Comparison of tangent and secant cylindrical, conic and azimuthal map projections with standard parallels shown in red

Secant planes are used in map projections. The secant plane intersects a globe along a small circle with no distortion, forming a standard parallel which has true scale.

== See also ==
- Circular section
- Circular segment
- Spherical cap
- Tangent space
