= Exs =

Exs, or EXS may refer to:

- Exsecant
- Jet2.com, a British airline
