= Intersecting secants theorem =

Geometry theorem relating line segments created by intersecting secants of a circle

$\triangle PAC \sim \triangle PBD$ yields $|PA|\cdot|PD|=|PB|\cdot|PC|$

In Euclidean geometry, the intersecting secants theorem or just secant theorem describes the relation of line segments created by two intersecting secants and the associated circle.

For two lines AD and BC that intersect each other at P and for which A, B, C, D all lie on the same circle, the following equation holds:

$$|PA|\cdot|PD| = |PB|\cdot|PC|$$

The theorem follows directly from the fact that the triangles △PAC and △PBD are similar. They share ∠DPC and ∠ADB = ∠ACB as they are inscribed angles over AB. The similarity yields an equation for ratios which is equivalent to the equation of the theorem given above:
$$\frac{PA}{PC}=\frac{PB}{PD} \Leftrightarrow |PA|\cdot|PD|=|PB|\cdot|PC|$$

Next to the intersecting chords theorem and the tangent-secant theorem, the intersecting secants theorem represents one of the three basic cases of a more general theorem about two intersecting lines and a circle – the power of point theorem.
