= Tangent–secant theorem =

Geometry theorem relating line segments created by a secant and tangent line

Beginning with the alternate segment theorem, $\begin{array}{cl} \implies & \angle PG_2T = \angle PTG_1 \\[4pt] \implies & \triangle PTG_2 \sim \triangle PG_1T \\[4pt] \implies & \frac{|PT|}{|PG_2|}=\frac{|PG_1|}{|PT|} \\[2pt] \implies & |PT|^2=|PG_1|\cdot|PG_2| \end{array}$

In Euclidean geometry, the tangent-secant theorem describes the relation of line segments created by a secant and a tangent line with the associated circle. This result is found as Proposition 36 in Book 3 of Euclid's Elements.

Given a secant g intersecting the circle at points G_{1} and G_{2} and a tangent t intersecting the circle at point T and given that g and t intersect at point P, the following equation holds:

$|PT|^2=|PG_1|\cdot|PG_2|$

The tangent-secant theorem can be proven using similar triangles (see graphic).

Like the intersecting chords theorem and the intersecting secants theorem, the tangent-secant theorem represents one of the three basic cases of a more general theorem about two intersecting lines and a circle, namely, the power of point theorem.
