= Circular arc =

Part of a circle between two points

A circular sector is shaded in green. Its curved boundary of length L is a circular arc.

A circular arc is the arc of a circle between a pair of distinct points. If the two points are not directly opposite each other, one of these arcs, the minor arc, subtends a central angle that is less than π radians (180 degrees); and the other arc, the major arc, subtends an angle greater than π radians. An arc of a circle is defined as a part of the circumference of the circle. A straight line that connects the two ends of an arc is known as a chord of the circle. If the length of an arc is exactly half of the circle, it is known as a semicircular arc.

== Length ==
The length (more precisely, arc length) of an arc of a circle with radius r and subtending an angle θ (measured in radians) with the circle center — i.e., the central angle — is

$$L = \theta r.$$

This is because

$$\frac{L}{\mathrm{circumference}}=\frac{\theta}{2\pi}.$$

Substituting in the circumference

$$\frac{L}{2\pi r}=\frac{\theta}{2\pi},$$

and, with α being the same angle measured in degrees, since θ = α/180π, the arc length equals

$$L=\frac{\alpha\pi r}{180}.$$

A practical way to determine the length of an arc in a circle is to plot two lines from the arc's endpoints to the center of the circle, measure the angle where the two lines meet the center, then solve for L by cross-multiplying the statement:

measure of angle in degrees/360° = L/circumference.

For example, if the measure of the angle is 60 degrees and the circumference is 24 inches, then

$$\begin{align} \frac{60}{360} &= \frac{L}{24} \\[6pt] 360L &= 1440 \\[6pt] L &= 4. \end{align}$$

This is so because the circumference of a circle and the degrees of a circle, of which there are always 360, are directly proportional.

The upper half of a circle can be parameterized as

$$y=\sqrt{r^2-x^2}.$$

Then the arc length from $x=a$ to $x=b$ is

$$L=r\Big[\arcsin \left(\frac{x}{r}\right)\Big]^b_a.$$

== Sector area ==
The area of the sector formed by an arc and the center of a circle (bounded by the arc and the two radii drawn to its endpoints) is

$$A=\frac{r^2 \theta}{2}.$$

The area A has the same proportion to the circle area as the angle θ to a full circle:

$$\frac{A}{\pi r^2}=\frac{\theta}{2\pi}.$$

We can cancel π on both sides:

$$\frac{A}{r^2}=\frac{\theta}{2}.$$

By multiplying both sides by r^{2}, we get the final result:

$$A=\frac{1}{2} r^2 \theta.$$

Using the conversion described above, we find that the area of the sector for a central angle measured in degrees is

$$A=\frac{\alpha}{360} \pi r^2.$$

== Segment area ==
The area of the shape bounded by the arc and the straight line between its two end points is

$$\frac{1}{2} r^2 (\theta - \sin\theta).$$

To get the area of the arc segment, we need to subtract the area of the triangle, determined by the circle's center and the two end points of the arc, from the area $A$. See Circular segment for details.

== Radius ==
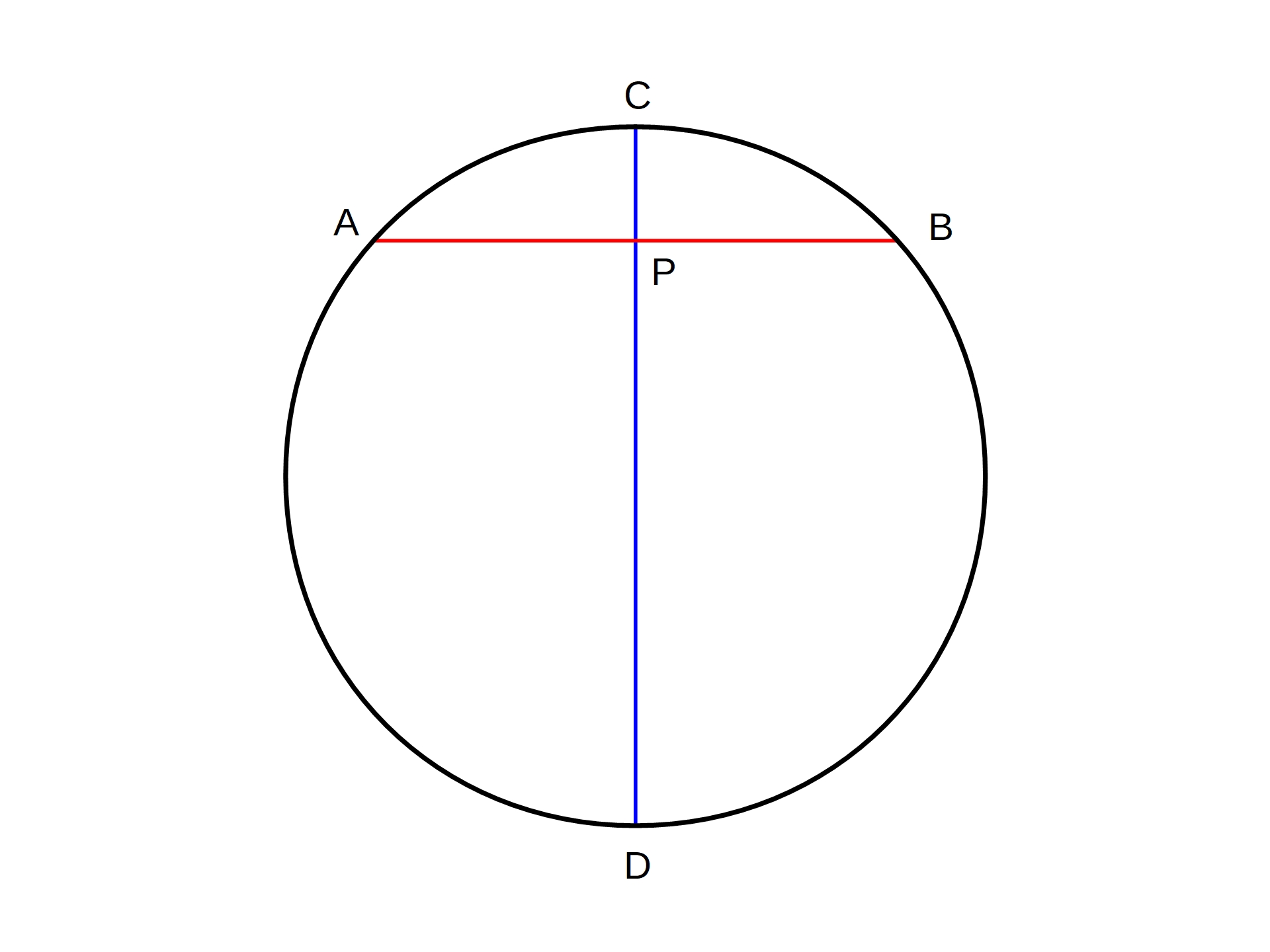
The product of the line segments AP and PB equals the product of the line segments CP and PD. If the arc has a width AB and height CP, then the circle's diameter $CD=\frac{AP \cdot PB}{CP}+CP$

Using the intersecting chords theorem (also known as power of a point or secant tangent theorem) it is possible to calculate the radius r of a circle given the height H and the width W of an arc:

Consider the chord with the same endpoints as the arc. Its perpendicular bisector is another chord, which is a diameter of the circle. The length of the first chord is W, and it is divided by the bisector into two equal halves, each with length W/2. The total length of the diameter is 2r, and it is divided into two parts by the first chord. The length of one part is the sagitta of the arc, H, and the other part is the remainder of the diameter, with length 2r − H. Applying the intersecting chords theorem to these two chords produces

$$H(2r-H)=\left(\frac{W}{2}\right)^2,$$

whence

$$2r-H=\frac{W^2}{4H},$$

so

$$r=\frac{W^2}{8H}+\frac{H}{2}.$$

The arc, chord, and sagitta derive their names respectively from the Latin words for bow, bowstring, and arrow.

== See also ==
- Biarc
- Circle of a sphere
- Circular-arc graph
- Circular interpolation
- Lemon (geometry)
- Meridian arc
- Circumference
- Circular motion
- Tangential speed
