= Monge's theorem =

Theorem in plane geometry

A visual representation of Monge's Theorem.The intersection of the red lines, that of the blue lines, and that of the green lines are collinear, all falling on the black line.

In geometry, Monge's theorem, named after Gaspard Monge, states that for any three circles in a plane, none of which is completely inside one of the others, the intersection points of each of the three pairs of external tangent lines are collinear.

For any two circles in a plane, an external tangent is a line that is tangent to both circles but does not pass between them. There are two such external tangent lines for any two circles. Each such pair has a unique intersection point in the extended Euclidean plane. Monge's theorem states that the three such points given by the three pairs of circles always lie in a straight line. In the case of two of the circles being of equal size, the two external tangent lines are parallel. In this case Monge's theorem asserts that the other two intersection points must lie on a line parallel to those two external tangents. In other words, if the two external tangents are considered to intersect at the point at infinity, then the other two intersection points must be on a line passing through the same point at infinity, so the line between them takes the same angle as the external tangent.

== Proofs ==
The simplest proof employs a three-dimensional analogy. Let the three circles correspond to three spheres of different radii; the circles correspond to the equators that result from a plane passing through the centers of the spheres. The three spheres can be sandwiched uniquely between two planes. Each pair of spheres defines a cone that is externally tangent to both spheres, and the apex of this cone corresponds to the intersection point of the two external tangents, i.e., the external homothetic center (center of similarity). Since one line of the cone lies in each plane, the apex of each cone must lie in both planes, and hence somewhere on the line of intersection of the two planes. Therefore, the three external homothetic centers are collinear.

This proof is somewhat flawed, however, as it cannot account for cases where the smallest circle is located between the other two, nor any case where one circle is fully contained by another. It can be made fully general by using cones of equal apex angle rather than spheres, creating three similar cones. Any pair of similar three dimensional objects has a center of similarity, about which you could scale either object to coincide with the other; these lines of similarity replace the external tangents of the previous proof. Further, the line connecting any two apex points must also intersect their center of similarity. The three apex points always define a plane in three dimensions, and all three centers of similarity must lie in the plane containing the circular bases. Hence, the three centers must lie on the intersection of the two planes, which must be a line in three dimensions.

Monge's theorem can also be proved by using Desargues' theorem. Another easy proof uses Menelaus' theorem, since the ratios can be calculated with the diameters of each circle, which will be eliminated by cyclic forms when using Menelaus' theorem. Desargues' theorem also asserts that 3 points lie on a line, and has a similar proof using the same idea of considering it in 3 rather than 2 dimensions and writing the line as an intersection of 2 planes.

== See also ==
- Homothetic centers of circles
- Problem of Apollonius

== Bibliography ==
- Graham, Louis A. (2012) [1959]. Ingenious Mathematical Problems and Methods (Dover reprint ed.). New York: Dover. ISBN 0486205452. LCCN 59-11841.
