= Sagitta (geometry) =

Distance from an arc's midpoint to the midpoint of its chord

Visualization of the sagitta, denoted as s

In geometry, the sagitta (sometimes abbreviated as sag, plural is sagittae) of a circular arc is the distance from the midpoint of the arc to the midpoint of its chord. It is used extensively in architecture when calculating the arc necessary to span a certain height and distance and also in optics where it is used to find the depth of a spherical mirror or lens. The name comes directly from Latin sagitta, meaning an "arrow" (with the circular arc representing a bow).

== Formulas ==
In the following equations, $s$ denotes the sagitta (the depth or height of the arc), $r$ equals the radius of the circle, and $l$ the length of the chord spanning the base of the arc. As $\tfrac12l$ and $r - s$ are two sides of a right triangle with $r$ as the hypotenuse, the Pythagorean theorem gives us
$$r^2 = \left(\tfrac12l\right)^2 + \left(r-s\right)^2\,.$$
This may be rearranged to give any one of $s$, $l$, or $r$ in terms of the other two:
$$\begin{align}
s &= r - \sqrt{r^2 - \tfrac14l^2}\,, \\[10mu]
l &= 2\sqrt{2rs - s^2}\,, \\[5px]
r &= \frac{s^2 + \tfrac14l^2}{2s} = \frac{s}{2}+\frac{l^2}{8s}\,.
\end{align}$$
The sagitta may also be calculated from the versine function, for an arc that spans an angle of Δ = 2θ, and coincides with the versine for unit circles. Generally, for a known value of θ, any of s, l, and r, can be computed from one of the others:
$$\begin{align}
s &= r \operatorname{versin}\theta = r\left(1-\cos\theta\right) = 2r\sin^2\frac\theta 2\,, \\
s &= \frac{l \operatorname{versin}\theta}{2 \sin \theta} = \frac{l (1 - \cos \theta)}{2 \sin \theta} = \frac{l \sin^2\frac\theta 2}{\sin \theta}\,, \\
l &= 2 r \sin \theta \,.
\end{align}$$

== Approximation ==
When the sagitta is small in comparison to the radius, it may be approximated by the formula
$$s\approx \frac{l^2}{8r}\,.$$

Alternatively, if the sagitta is small and the sagitta, radius, and chord length are known, they may be used to estimate the arc length by the formula
$$a\approx l+\frac{2 s^2}{r}\approx l+\frac{8 s^2}{3 l}\,,$$
where a is the length of the arc; this formula was known to the Chinese mathematician Shen Kuo, and a more accurate formula also involving the sagitta was developed two centuries later by Guo Shoujing.

== Applications ==
Architects, engineers, and contractors use these equations to create "flattened" arcs that are used in curved walls, arched ceilings, bridges, and numerous other applications.

The sagitta also has uses in physics where it is used, along with chord length, to calculate the radius of curvature of an accelerated particle. This is used especially in bubble chamber experiments where it is used to determine the momenta of decay particles. Likewise historically the sagitta is also utilised as a parameter in the calculation of moving bodies in a centripetal system. This method is utilised in Newton's Principia.

== See also ==
- Circular segment
- Versine
- Jyā, koti-jyā and utkrama-jyā
