= Thales's theorem =

On triangles inscribed in a circle with a diameter as an edge

Thales’ theorem: if A̅C̅ is a diameter and B is a point on the diameter's circle, the angle ∠ ABC is a right angle.

Thales's theorem animation

In geometry, Thales's theorem states that if A, B, and C are distinct points on a circle where the line A̅C̅ is a diameter, the angle ∠ ABC is a right angle. Thales's theorem is a special case of the inscribed angle theorem and is mentioned and proved as part of the 31st proposition in the third book of Euclid's Elements. It is generally attributed to Thales of Miletus, but it is sometimes attributed to Pythagoras.

== History ==
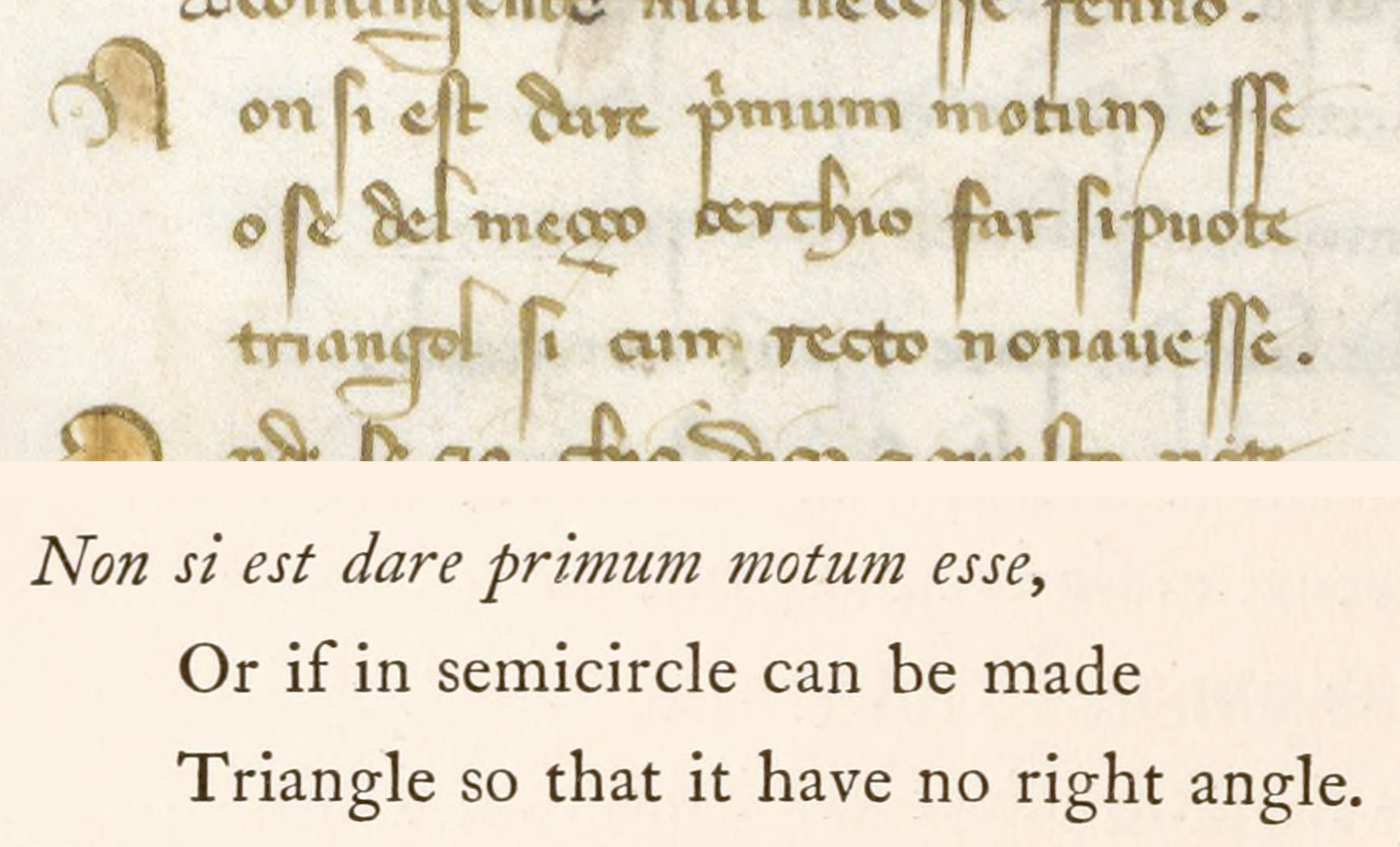
Non si est dare primum motum esse o se del mezzo cerchio far si puote triangol sì c'un recto nonauesse. – Dante's Paradiso, Canto 13, lines 100–102 Non si est dare primum motum esse, Or if in semicircle can be made Triangle so that it have no right angle. – English translation by Longfellow

Thales of Miletus (early 6th century BC) is traditionally credited with proving the theorem; however, even by the 5th century BC there was nothing extant of Thales' writing, and inventions and ideas were attributed to men of wisdom such as Thales and Pythagoras by later doxographers based on hearsay and speculation. Reference to Thales was made by Proclus (5th century AD), and by Diogenes Laërtius (3rd century AD) documenting Pamphila's (1st century AD) statement that Thales "was the first to inscribe in a circle a right-angle triangle".

Thales was claimed to have traveled to Egypt and Babylonia, where he is supposed to have learned about geometry and astronomy and thence brought their knowledge to the Greeks, along the way inventing the concept of geometric proof and proving various geometric theorems. However, there is no direct evidence for any of these claims, and they were most likely invented speculative rationalizations. Modern scholars believe that Greek deductive geometry as found in Euclid's Elements was not developed until the 4th century BC, and any geometric knowledge Thales may have had would have been observational.

The theorem appears in Book III of Euclid's Elements (c. 300 BC) as proposition 31: "In a circle the angle in the semicircle is right, that in a greater segment less than a right angle, and that in a less segment greater than a right angle; further the angle of the greater segment is greater than a right angle, and the angle of the less segment is less than a right angle."

Dante Alighieri's Paradiso (canto 13, lines 101–102) refers to Thales's theorem in the course of a speech.

== Proof ==
=== First proof ===
The following facts are used: the sum of the angles in a triangle is equal to 180° and the base angles of an isosceles triangle are equal.

Provided A̅C̅ is a diameter, angle at B is constant right (90°).

Figure for the proof.

Since O̅A̅ = O̅B̅ = O̅C̅, △OBA and △OBC are isosceles triangles, and by the equality of the base angles of an isosceles triangle, ∠ OBC = ∠ OCB and ∠ OBA = ∠ OAB.

Let α = ∠ BAO and β = ∠ OBC. The three internal angles of the ∆ABC triangle are α, (α + β), and β. Since the sum of the angles of a triangle is equal to 180°, we have
$$\begin{align}
\alpha+ (\alpha + \beta) + \beta &= 180^\circ \\
2\alpha + 2\beta &= 180^\circ \\
2( \alpha + \beta ) &= 180^\circ \\
\therefore \alpha + \beta &= 90^\circ.
\end{align}$$

Q.E.D.

=== Second proof ===
The theorem may also be proven using trigonometry: Let O = (0, 0), A = (−1, 0), and C = (1, 0). Then B is a point on the unit circle (cos θ, sin θ). We will show that △ABC forms a right angle by proving that A̅B̅ and B̅C̅ are perpendicular — that is, the product of their slopes is equal to −1. We calculate the slopes for A̅B̅ and B̅C̅:
$$\begin{align}
m_{AB} &= \frac{y_B - y_A}{x_B - x_A} = \frac{\sin \theta}{\cos \theta + 1} \\[2pt]
m_{BC} &= \frac{y_C - y_B}{x_C - x_B} = \frac{-\sin \theta}{-\cos \theta + 1}
\end{align}$$

Then we show that their product equals −1:
$$\begin{align}
&m_{AB} \cdot m_{BC}\\[4pt]
= {} & \frac{\sin \theta}{\cos \theta + 1} \cdot \frac{-\sin \theta}{-\cos \theta + 1}\\[4pt]
= {} & \frac{-\sin ^2 \theta}{-\cos ^2 \theta +1}\\[4pt]
= {} & \frac{-\sin ^2 \theta}{\sin ^2 \theta}\\[4pt]
= {} & {-1}
\end{align}$$

Note the use of the Pythagorean trigonometric identity $\sin^2 \theta + \cos^2 \theta = 1.$

=== Third proof ===
Showing a proof of Thales' theorem by rotating the triangle and observing that you get a rectangle in this way (both diagonals are the same length)

Let △ABC be a triangle in a circle where AB is a diameter in that circle. Then construct a new triangle △ABD by rotating △ABC by 180° over the center of the circle O. Since we rotated over 180°, lines AC and BD are parallel, likewise for AD and CB. It follows that the quadrilateral ACBD is a parallelogram. The lines OC and OD are likewise parallel and meet in O, so CD is a straight line through O, meaning CD is a diameter of the circle. Since lines AB and CD, the diagonals of the parallelogram, are both diameters of the circle and therefore have equal length, the parallelogram must be a rectangle. All angles in a rectangle are right angles.

=== Fourth proof ===
The theorem can be proved using vector algebra. Let's take the vectors $\overrightarrow{AB}$ and $\overrightarrow{CB}$. These vectors satisfy
$$\overrightarrow{AB} = \overrightarrow{AO} + \overrightarrow{OB}\qquad \qquad \overrightarrow{CB} = \overrightarrow{CO} + \overrightarrow{OB}$$
and their dot product can be expanded as
$$\overrightarrow{AB}\cdot\overrightarrow{CB} = \left(\overrightarrow{AO} + \overrightarrow{OB}\right)\cdot\left( \overrightarrow{CO} + \overrightarrow{OB}\right) =\overrightarrow{AO}\cdot\overrightarrow{CO}+(\overrightarrow{AO}+\overrightarrow{CO})\cdot \overrightarrow{OB}+\overrightarrow{OB}\cdot\overrightarrow{OB}$$
but
$$\overrightarrow{AO}=-\overrightarrow{CO}\qquad\qquad \overrightarrow{AO}\cdot\overrightarrow{CO}=-R^2\qquad\qquad \overrightarrow{OB}\cdot\overrightarrow{OB} = R^2$$
and the dot product vanishes
$$\overrightarrow{AB}\cdot\overrightarrow{CB} = -R^2+\overrightarrow{0}\cdot \overrightarrow{OB}+R^2=0$$
and then the vectors $\overrightarrow{AB}$ and $\overrightarrow{CB}$ are orthogonal and the angle ABC is a right angle.

== Converse ==
For any triangle, and, in particular, any right triangle, there is exactly one circle containing all three vertices of the triangle. This circle is called the circumcircle of the triangle. Its center is called the circumcenter, which is the intersection point of the perpendicular bisectors of the triangle.

Uniqueness proof (sketch)

The locus of points equidistant from two given points is a straight line that is called the perpendicular bisector of the line segment connecting the points. The perpendicular bisectors of any two sides of a triangle intersect in exactly one point. This point must be equidistant from the vertices of the triangle.

One way of formulating Thales's theorem is: if the circumcenter lies on the triangle then the triangle is right, and it is on its hypotenuse.

The converse of Thales's theorem is then: the circumcenter of a right triangle lies on its hypotenuse. (Equivalently, a right triangle's hypotenuse is a diameter of its circumcircle.)

=== Proof of the converse using geometry ===
Figure for the proof of the converse

This proof consists of 'completing' the right triangle to form a rectangle and noticing that the center of that rectangle is equidistant from the vertices and so is the center of the circumscribing circle of the original triangle, it utilizes two facts:

- adjacent angles in a parallelogram are supplementary (add to 180°) and,
- the diagonals of a rectangle are equal and cross each other in their median point.

Let there be a right angle ∠ ABC, r a line parallel to B̅C̅ passing by A, and s a line parallel to A̅B̅ passing by C. Let D be the point of intersection of lines r and s. (It has not been proven that D lies on the circle.)

The quadrilateral ABCD forms a parallelogram by construction (as opposite sides are parallel). Since in a parallelogram adjacent angles are supplementary (add to 180°) and ∠ ABC is a right angle (90°) then angles ∠ BAD, ∠ BCD, ∠ ADC are also right (90°); consequently ABCD is a rectangle and D lies on the circle.

Let O be the point of intersection of the diagonals A̅C̅ and B̅D̅. Then the point O, by the second fact above, is equidistant from A, B, and C. And so O is center of the circumscribing circle, and the hypotenuse of the triangle (A̅C̅) is a diameter of the circle.

=== Alternate proof of the converse using geometry ===
Given a right triangle ABC with hypotenuse AC, construct a circle Ω whose diameter is AC. Let O be the center of Ω. Let D be the intersection of Ω and the ray OB. By Thales's theorem, ∠ ADC is right. But then D must equal B. (If D lies inside △ABC, ∠ ADC would be obtuse, and if D lies outside △ABC, ∠ ADC would be acute.)

=== Proof of the converse using linear algebra ===
This proof utilizes two facts:

- two lines form a right angle if and only if the dot product of their directional vectors is zero, and
- the square of the length of a vector is given by the dot product of the vector with itself.

Let there be a right angle ∠ ABC and circle M with A̅C̅ as a diameter. Let M's center lie on the origin, for easier calculation. Then we know

- A = −C, because the circle centered at the origin has A̅C̅ as diameter, and
- (A – B) · (B – C) = 0, because ∠ ABC is a right angle.

It follows
$$\begin{align}
0 &= (A-B) \cdot (B-C) \\
&= (A-B) \cdot (B+A) \\
&= |A|^2 - |B|^2. \\[4pt]
\therefore \ |A| &= |B|.
\end{align}$$

This means that A and B are equidistant from the origin, i.e. from the center of M. Since A lies on M, so does B, and the circle M is therefore the triangle's circumcircle.

The above calculations in fact establish that both directions of Thales's theorem are valid in any inner product space.

== Generalizations and related results ==
As stated above, Thales's theorem is a special case of the inscribed angle theorem (the proof of which is quite similar to the first proof of Thales's theorem given above):

Given three points A, B and C on a circle with center O, the angle ∠ AOC is twice as large as the angle ∠ ABC.

A related result to Thales's theorem is the following:

- If A̅C̅ is a diameter of a circle, then:
  - If B is inside the circle, then ∠ ABC > 90°
  - If B is on the circle, then ∠ ABC = 90°
  - If B is outside the circle, then ∠ ABC < 90°.

== Applications ==
=== Constructing a tangent to a circle passing through a point ===
Constructing a tangent using Thales's theorem.

Thales's theorem can be used to construct the tangent to a given circle that passes through a given point. In the figure at right, given circle k with centre O and the point P outside k, bisect O̅P̅ at H and draw the circle of radius O̅H̅ with centre H. O̅P̅ is a diameter of this circle, so the triangles connecting OP to the points T and T′ where the circles intersect are both right triangles.

Geometric method to find $\sqrt{p}$ using the geometric mean theorem $h=\sqrt{pq}$ with $q=1$

=== Finding the centre of a circle ===
Thales's theorem can also be used to find the centre of a circle using an object with a right angle, such as a set square or rectangular sheet of paper larger than the circle. The angle is placed anywhere on its circumference (figure 1). The intersections of the two sides with the circumference define a diameter (figure 2). Repeating this with a different set of intersections yields another diameter (figure 3). The centre is at the intersection of the diameters.

Illustration of the use of Thales's theorem and a right angle to find the centre of a circle

== See also ==
- Inverse Pythagorean theorem
- Synthetic geometry
