= Midpoint theorem (conics) =

Collinearity of the midpoints of parallel chords in a conic

In geometry, the midpoint theorem describes a property of parallel chords in a conic. It states that the midpoints of parallel chords in a conic are located on a common line.

The common line or line segment for the midpoints is called the diameter. For a circle, ellipse or hyperbola the diameter goes through its center. For a parabola the diameter is always perpendicular to its directrix and for a pair of intersecting lines (from a degenerate conic) the diameter goes through the point of intersection.

Gallery ($e$ = eccentricity):

circle ($e$=0)

ellipse ($e$<1)

parabola ($e$=1)

hyperbola ($e$>1)

intersecting lines ($e$=∞)
