= Subtended angle =

Concept in geometry

Example of the angles subtended by an arc from two points

In geometry, an angle subtended (from Latin for "stretched under") by a line segment at an arbitrary vertex is formed by the two rays between the vertex and each endpoint of the segment. For example, a side of a triangle subtends the opposite angle.

More generally, an angle subtended by an arc of a curve is the angle subtended by the corresponding chord of the arc. For example, a circular arc subtends the central angle formed by the two radii through the arc endpoints.

If an angle is subtended by a straight or curved segment, the segment is said to subtend the angle. Sometimes the term "subtend" is applied in the opposite sense, and the angle is said to subtend the segment. Alternately, the angle can be said to intercept or enclose the segment.

The above definition of a subtended plane angle remains valid in three-dimensional space (3D), as one vertex and two endpoints (assumed non-collinear) define an Euclidean plane in 3D. For example, an arc of a great circle on a sphere subtends a central plane angle, formed by the two radii between the center of the sphere and each of the two arc endpoints.

More generally, a surface subtends a solid angle if its boundary defines the cone of the angle.

Many theorems in geometry relate to subtended angles. If two sides of a triangle are congruent, then the angles they subtend are also congruent, and conversely if two angles are congruent then they are subtended by congruent sides (propositions I.5–6 in Euclid's Elements), forming an isosceles triangle. More generally, the law of sines states that the sine of each angle of a triangle is proportional to the side subtending it. The inscribed angle theorem states that when the vertex of an angle inscribed in a circle lies on the same side of the chord subtending it as the center of the circle, then the central angle subtended by the same chord is twice the inscribed angle.

By extension, an angle subtended by a more complex geometric figure may be defined in terms of the figure's convex hull and its diameter; for example, the angle subtended by a tree as viewed in a camera. A subtended plane angle can also be defined for any two arbitrary isolated points and a vertex, as in two lines of sight from a particular viewer; for example, the angle subtended by two stars as seen from Earth.
