= Power of a point =

Relative distance of a point from a circle

Geometric meaning

In elementary plane geometry, the power of a point is a real number that reflects the relative distance of a given point from a given circle. It was introduced by Jakob Steiner in 1826.

Specifically, the power $\Pi(P)$ of a point $P$ with respect to a circle $c$ with center $O$ and radius $r$ is defined by

$$\Pi(P)=|PO|^2 - r^2.$$

If $P$ is outside the circle, then $\Pi(P)>0$,
if $P$ is on the circle, then $\Pi(P)=0$ and
if $P$ is inside the circle, then $\Pi(P)<0$.

Due to the Pythagorean theorem the number $\Pi(P)$ has the simple geometric meanings shown in the diagram: For a point $P$ outside the circle, $\Pi(P)$ is the squared tangential distance $|PT|$ of point $P$ to a point $T$ on the circle $c$.

Points with equal power, isolines of $\Pi(P)$, are circles concentric to the original circle $c$.

Steiner used the power of a point for proofs of several statements on circles, for example:

- Determination of a circle, that intersects four circles by the same angle.
- Solving the problem of Apollonius
- Construction of the Malfatti circles: For a given triangle determine three circles, which touch each other and two sides of the triangle each.
- Spherical version of Malfatti's problem: The triangle is a spherical one.

Essential tools for investigations on circles are the radical axis of two circles and the radical center of three circles.

The power diagram of a set of circles divides the plane into regions within which the circle minimizing the power is constant.

More generally, French mathematician Edmond Laguerre defined the power of a point with respect to any algebraic curve in a similar way.

== Geometric properties ==
Besides the properties mentioned in the lead there are further properties:

=== Orthogonal circle ===
Orthogonal circle (green)

For any point $P$ outside of the circle $c$ there are two tangent points $T_1,T_2$ on circle $c$, which have equal distance to $P$. Hence the circle $o$ with center $P$ through $T_1$ passes $T_2$, too, and intersects $c$ orthogonal:

- The circle with center $P$ and radius $\sqrt{\Pi(P)}$ intersects circle $c$ orthogonal.

Angle between two circles

If the radius $\rho$ of the circle centered at $P$ is different from $\sqrt{\Pi(P)}$ one gets the angle of intersection $\varphi$ between the two circles applying the Law of cosines (see the diagram):

$$\rho^2+r^2-2\rho r \cos\varphi=|PO|^2$$
$$\rightarrow \
\cos\varphi=\frac{\rho^2+r^2-|PO|^2}{2\rho r}=\frac{\rho^2-\Pi(P)}{2\rho r}$$

($PS_1$ and $OS_1$ are normals to the circle tangents.)

If $P$ lies inside the blue circle, then $\Pi(P)<0$ and $\varphi$ is always different from $90^\circ$.

If the angle $\varphi$ is given, then one gets the radius $\rho$ by solving the quadratic equation

$$\rho^2-2\rho r \cos\varphi-\Pi(P)=0$$.

=== Intersecting secants theorem, intersecting chords theorem ===
Secant-, chord-theorem

For the intersecting secants theorem and chord theorem the power of a point plays the role of an invariant:

- Intersecting secants theorem: For a point $P$ outside a circle $c$ and the intersection points $S_1,S_2$ of a secant line $g$ with $c$ the following statement is true: $|PS_1| \cdot |PS_2|= \Pi(P)$, hence the product is independent of line $g$. If $g$ is tangent then $S_1=S_2$ and the statement is the tangent-secant theorem.
- Intersecting chords theorem: For a point $P$ inside a circle $c$ and the intersection points $S_1,S_2$ of a secant line $g$ with $c$ the following statement is true: $|PS_1| \cdot |PS_2|= -\Pi(P)$, hence the product is independent of line $g$.

=== Radical axis ===
Let $P$ be a point and $c_1,c_2$ two non concentric circles with centers $O_1,O_2$ and radii $r_1,r_2$. Point $P$ has the power $\Pi_i(P)$ with respect to circle $c_i$. The set of all points $P$ with $\Pi_1(P)=\Pi_2(P)$ is a line called radical axis. It contains possible common points of the circles and is perpendicular to line $\overline{O_1O_2}$.

== Secants theorem, chords theorem: common proof ==
Secant-/chord-theorem: proof

Both theorems, including the tangent-secant theorem, can be proven uniformly:

Let $P:\vec p$ be a point, $c: \vec x^2-r^2=0$ a circle with the origin as its center and $\vec v$ an arbitrary unit vector. The parameters $t_1,t_2$ of possible common points of line $g: \vec x=\vec p+t\vec v$ (through $P$) and circle $c$ can be determined by inserting the parametric equation into the circle's equation:

$$(\vec p+t\vec v)^2-r^2=0 \quad  \rightarrow \quad
t^2+2t\;\vec p\cdot\vec v +\vec p^2-r^2=0 \ .$$

From Vieta's theorem one finds:

$t_1\cdot t_2=\vec p^2-r^2 =\Pi(P)$. (independent of $\vec v$)

$\Pi(P)$ is the power of $P$ with respect to circle $c$.

Because of $|\vec v|=1$ one gets the following statement for the points $S_1,S_2$:

$|PS_1|\cdot|PS_2|=t_1t_2=\Pi(P)\$, if $P$ is outside the circle,
$|PS_1|\cdot|PS_2|=-t_1t_2=-\Pi(P)\$, if $P$ is inside the circle ($t_1,t_2$ have different signs !).

In case of $t_1=t_2$ line $g$ is a tangent and $\Pi(P)$ the square of the tangential distance of point $P$ to circle $c$.

== Similarity points, common power of two circles ==
=== Similarity points ===
Similarity points are an essential tool for Steiner's investigations on circles.

Given two circles

$$\ c_1: (\vec x -\vec m_1)^2-r_1^2=0, \quad  c_2: (\vec x -\vec m_2)^2-r_2^2=0 \ .$$

A homothety (similarity) $\sigma$, that maps $c_1$ onto $c_2$ stretches (jolts) radius $r_1$ to $r_2$ and has its center $Z:\vec z$ on the line $\overline{M_1 M_2}$, because $\sigma(M_1)=M_2$. If center $Z$ is between $M_1,M_2$ the scale factor is $s=-\tfrac{r_2}{r_1}$. In the other case $s=\tfrac{r_2}{r_1}$. In any case:

$$\sigma(\vec m_1)=\vec z + s(\vec m_1-\vec z)=\vec m_2$$.

Inserting $s=\pm\tfrac{r_2}{r_1}$ and solving for $\vec z$ yields:

$$\vec z= \frac{r_1\vec m_2\mp r_2\vec m_1}{r_1\mp r_2}$$.

Similarity points of two circles: various cases

Point
$$E:\vec e=\frac{r_1\vec m_2-r_2\vec m_1}{r_1-r_2}$$
is called the exterior similarity point and
$$I:\vec i=\frac{r_1\vec m_2+r_2\vec m_1}{r_1+r_2}$$
is called the inner similarity point.

In case of $M_1=M_2$ one gets $E=I=M_i$.
In case of $r_1=r_2$: $E$ is the point at infinity of line $\overline{M_1 M_2}$ and $I$ is the center of $M_1,M_2$.
In case of $r_1=|EM_1|$ the circles touch each other at point $E$ inside (both circles on the same side of the common tangent line).
In case of $r_1=|IM_1|$ the circles touch each other at point $I$ outside (both circles on different sides of the common tangent line).

Further more:

- If the circles lie disjoint (the discs have no points in common), the outside common tangents meet at $E$ and the inner ones at $I$.
- If one circle is contained within the other, the points $E,I$ lie within both circles.
- The pairs $M_1,M_2;E,I$ are projective harmonic conjugate: Their cross ratio is $(M_1,M_2;E,I)=-1$.

Monge's theorem states: The outer similarity points of three disjoint circles lie on a line.

=== Common power of two circles ===
Similarity points of two circles and their common power

Let $c_1,c_2$ be two circles, $E$ their outer similarity point and $g$ a line through $E$, which meets the two circles at four points $G_1,H_1,G_2,H_2$. From the defining property of point $E$ one gets

$$\frac{|EG_1|}{|EG_2|}=\frac{r_1}{r_2}=\frac{|EH_1|}{|EH_2|}\$$
$$\rightarrow \ |EG_1|\cdot|EH_2|=|EH_1|\cdot|EG_2|\$$

and from the secant theorem (see above) the two equations

$$|EG_1|\cdot|EH_1|=\Pi_1(E),\quad |EG_2|\cdot|EH_2|=\Pi_2(E) .$$

Combining these three equations yields:
$$\begin{align}
\Pi_1(E)\cdot\Pi_2(E) &=|EG_1|\cdot|EH_1|\cdot|EG_2|\cdot|EH_2| \\
&=|EG_1|^2\cdot|EH_2|^2= |EG_2|^2\cdot|EH_1|^2 \ .
\end{align}$$
Hence:
$$|EG_1|\cdot|EH_2|= |EG_2| \cdot |EH_1|=\sqrt{ \Pi_1(E)\cdot\Pi_2(E)}$$
(independent of line $g$ !). The analog statement for the inner similarity point $I$ is true, too.

The invariants $\sqrt{\Pi_1(E)\cdot\Pi_2(E)},\ \sqrt{ \Pi_1(I)\cdot\Pi_2(I)}$ are called by Steiner common power of the two circles (gemeinschaftliche Potenz der beiden Kreise bezüglich ihrer Ähnlichkeitspunkte).

The pairs $G_1,H_2$ and $H_1,G_2$ of points are antihomologous points. The pairs $G_1,G_2$ and $H_1,H_2$ are homologous.

=== Determination of a circle that is tangent to two circles ===
Common power of two circles: application

Circles tangent to two circles

For a second secant through $E$:

$$|EH_1|\cdot|EG_2|= |EH'_1|\cdot|EG'_2|$$

From the secant theorem one gets:

The four points $H_1,G_2,H'_1,G'_2$ lie on a circle.

And analogously:

The four points $G_1,H_2,G'_1,H'_2$ lie on a circle, too.

Because the radical lines of three circles meet at the radical (see: article radical line), one gets:

The secants $\overline{H_1H'_1},\;\overline{G_2G'_2}$ meet on the radical axis of the given two circles.

Moving the lower secant (see diagram) towards the upper one, the red circle becomes a circle, that is tangent to both given circles. The center of the tangent circle is the intercept of the lines $\overline{M_1H_1},\overline{M_2G_2}$. The secants $\overline{H_1H'_1}, \overline{G_2G'_2}$ become tangents at the points $H_1,G_2$. The tangents intercept at the radical line $p$ (in the diagram yellow).

Similar considerations generate the second tangent circle, that meets the given circles at the points $G_1,H_2$ (see diagram).

All tangent circles to the given circles can be found by varying line $g$.

Positions of the centers

Circles tangent to two circles

If $X$ is the center and $\rho$ the radius of the circle, that is tangent to the given circles at the points $H_1,G_2$, then:

$$\rho=|XM_1|-r_1=|XM_2|-r_2$$
$$\rightarrow \ |XM_2|-|XM_1|=r_2-r_1 .$$

Hence: the centers lie on a hyperbola with

foci $M_1,M_2$,
distance of the vertices $2a=r_2-r_1$,
center $M$ is the center of $M_1,M_2$ ,
linear eccentricity $c=\tfrac{|M_1M_2|}{2}$ and
$\ b^2=e^2-a^2=\tfrac{|M_1M_2|^2-(r_2-r_1)^2}{4}$.

Considerations on the outside tangent circles lead to the analog result:

If $X$ is the center and $\rho$ the radius of the circle, that is tangent to the given circles at the points $G_1,H_2$, then:

$$\rho=|XM_1|+r_1=|XM_2|+r_2$$
$$\rightarrow \ |XM_2|-|XM_1|=-(r_2-r_1) .$$

The centers lie on the same hyperbola, but on the right branch.

See also Problem of Apollonius.

Power of a point with respect to a sphere

== Power with respect to a sphere ==
The idea of the power of a point with respect to a circle can be extended to a sphere. The secants and chords theorems are true for a sphere, too, and can be proven literally as in the circle case.

== Darboux product ==
The power of a point is a special case of the Darboux product between two circles, which is given by

$$\left| A_1A_2 \right|^2-r_1^2-r_2^2 \,$$

where A_{1} and A_{2} are the centers of the two circles and r_{1} and r_{2} are their radii. The power of a point arises in the special case that one of the radii is zero.

If the two circles are orthogonal, the Darboux product vanishes.

If the two circles intersect, then their Darboux product is

$$2r_1 r_2 \cos\varphi \,$$

where φ is the angle of intersection (see section orthogonal circle).

== Laguerre's theorem ==
Laguerre defined the power of a point P with respect to an algebraic curve of degree n to be the sum of the distances from the point to the intersections of a circle through the point with the curve, divided by the nth power of the diameter d. Laguerre showed that this number is independent of the diameter (Laguerre 1905). In the case when the algebraic curve is a circle this is not quite the same as the power of a point with respect to a circle defined in the rest of this article, but differs from it by a factor of d^{2}.
