= Central angle =

Angle between two radii of a circle

Angle ∠AOB is a central angle.

In geometry, a central angle is an angle whose apex (vertex) is the center O of a circle and whose legs (sides) are radii intersecting the circle in two distinct points A and B. Central angles are subtended by an arc between those two points, and the arc length is the central angle of a circle of radius one (measured in radians). The central angle is also known as the arc's angular distance. The arc length spanned by a central angle on a sphere is called spherical distance.

The size of a central angle θ is 0° < θ < 360° or 0 < θ < 2π (radians). When defining or drawing a central angle, in addition to specifying the points A and B, one must specify whether the angle being defined is the convex angle (<180°) or the reflex angle (>180°). Equivalently, one must specify whether the movement from point A to point B is clockwise or counterclockwise.

== Formulas ==
If the intersection points A and B of the legs of the angle with the circle form a diameter, then θ = 180° is a straight angle. (In radians, θ = π.)

Let L be the minor arc of the circle between points A and B, and let R be the radius of the circle.

Convex central angle, subtended by minor arc L.

If the central angle θ is subtended by L, then
$$0^{\circ} < \theta < 180^{\circ} \, , \quad \theta = \left( {\frac{180L}{\pi R}} \right) ^{\circ}=\frac{L}{R}.$$

Proof (for degrees)

The circumference of a circle with radius R is 2πR, and the minor arc L is the θ/360° proportional part of the whole circumference (see arc). So:
$$L=\frac{\theta}{360^{\circ}} \cdot 2 \pi R \quad \Rightarrow  \quad \theta = \left( {\frac{180L}{\pi R}} \right) ^{\circ}.$$

Reflex central angle, not subtended by L.

Proof (for radians)

The circumference of a circle with radius R is 2πR, and the minor arc L is the θ/2π proportional part of the whole circumference (see arc). So
$$L=\frac{\theta}{2 \pi} \cdot 2 \pi R \quad \Rightarrow  \quad \theta = \frac{L}{R}.$$

If the central angle θ is not subtended by the minor arc L, then θ is a reflex angle and
$$180^{\circ} < \theta < 360^{\circ} \, , \quad \theta = \left( 360 - \frac{180L}{\pi R} \right) ^{\circ}=2\pi-\frac{L}{R}.$$

If a tangent at A and a tangent at B intersect at the exterior point P, then denoting the center as O, the angles ∠BOA (convex) and ∠BPA are supplementary (sum to 180°).

== Central angle of a regular polygon ==
A regular polygon with n sides has a circumscribed circle upon which all its vertices lie, and the center of the circle is also the center of the polygon. The central angle of the regular polygon is formed at the center by the circumradii to two adjacent vertices. The measure of this angle is $2\pi/n.$

== See also ==
- Chord (geometry)
- Inscribed angle
- Great-circle navigation
