= Secant line =

Line that intersects a curve at least twice

In geometry, a secant is a line that intersects a curve at a minimum of two distinct points. The word secant comes from the Latin word secare, meaning "to cut". In the case of a circle, a secant intersects the circle at exactly two points. A chord is the line segment determined by the two points, that is, the interval on the secant whose ends are the two points.

== Circles ==
Common lines and line segments on a circle, including a secant

A straight line can intersect a circle at zero, one, or two points. A line with intersections at two points is called a secant line, at one point a tangent line and at no points an exterior line. A chord is the line segment that joins two distinct points of a circle. A chord is therefore contained in a unique secant line and each secant line determines a unique chord.

In rigorous modern treatments of plane geometry, results that seem obvious and were assumed (without statement) by Euclid in his treatment, are usually proved.

For example, Theorem (Elementary Circular Continuity): If $\mathcal{C}$ is a circle and $\ell$ a line that contains a point A that is inside $\mathcal{C}$ and a point B that is outside of $\mathcal{C}$ then $\ell$ is a secant line for $\mathcal{C}$.

In some situations phrasing results in terms of secant lines instead of chords can help to unify statements. As an example of this consider the result:

If two secant lines contain chords A̅B̅ and C̅D̅ in a circle and intersect at a point P that is not on the circle, then the line segment lengths satisfy AP⋅PB = CP⋅PD.

If the point P lies inside the circle this is Euclid III.35, but if the point is outside the circle the result is not contained in the Elements. However, Robert Simson following Christopher Clavius demonstrated this result, sometimes called the intersecting secants theorem, in their commentaries on Euclid.

== Curves ==
For curves more complicated than simple circles, the possibility that a line that intersects a curve in more than two distinct points arises. Some authors define a secant line to a curve as a line that intersects the curve in two distinct points. This definition leaves open the possibility that the line may have other points of intersection with the curve. When phrased this way the definitions of a secant line for circles and curves are identical and the possibility of additional points of intersection just does not occur for a circle.

=== Secants and tangents ===
Secants may be used to approximate the tangent line to a curve, at some point P, if it exists. Define a secant to a curve by two points, P and Q, with P fixed and Q variable. As Q approaches P along the curve, if the slope of the secant approaches a limit value, then that limit defines the slope of the tangent line at P. The secant lines P̅Q̅ are the approximations to the tangent line. In calculus, this idea is the geometric definition of the derivative.

The tangent line at point P is a secant line of the curve

A tangent line to a curve at a point P may be a secant line to that curve if it intersects the curve in at least one point other than P. Another way to look at this is to realize that being a tangent line at a point P is a local property, depending only on the curve in the immediate neighborhood of P, while being a secant line is a global property since the entire domain of the function producing the curve needs to be examined.

== Sets and n-secants ==
The concept of a secant line can be applied in a more general setting than Euclidean space. Let K be a finite set of k points in some geometric setting. A line will be called an n-secant of K if it contains exactly n points of K. For example, if K is a set of 50 points arranged on a circle in the Euclidean plane, a line joining two of them would be a 2-secant (or bisecant) and a line passing through only one of them would be a 1-secant (or unisecant). A unisecant in this example need not be a tangent line to the circle.

This terminology is often used in incidence geometry and discrete geometry. For instance, the Sylvester–Gallai theorem of incidence geometry states that if n points of Euclidean geometry are not collinear then there must exist a 2-secant of them. And the original orchard-planting problem of discrete geometry asks for a bound on the number of 3-secants of a finite set of points.

Finiteness of the set of points is not essential in this definition, as long as each line can intersect the set in only a finite number of points.

== See also ==
- Elliptic curve, a curve for which every secant has a third point of intersection, from which most of a group law may be defined
- Mean value theorem, that every secant of the graph of a smooth function has a parallel tangent line
- Quadrisecant, a line that intersects four points of a curve (usually a space curve)
- Secant plane, the three-dimensional equivalent of a secant line
- Secant variety, the union of secant lines and tangent lines to a given projective variety
- Tangent-secant theorem, which describes the relation between line segments created by a secant and a tangent
