= Benjamin Alvord (mathematician) =

United States Army general and scientist (1813–1884)

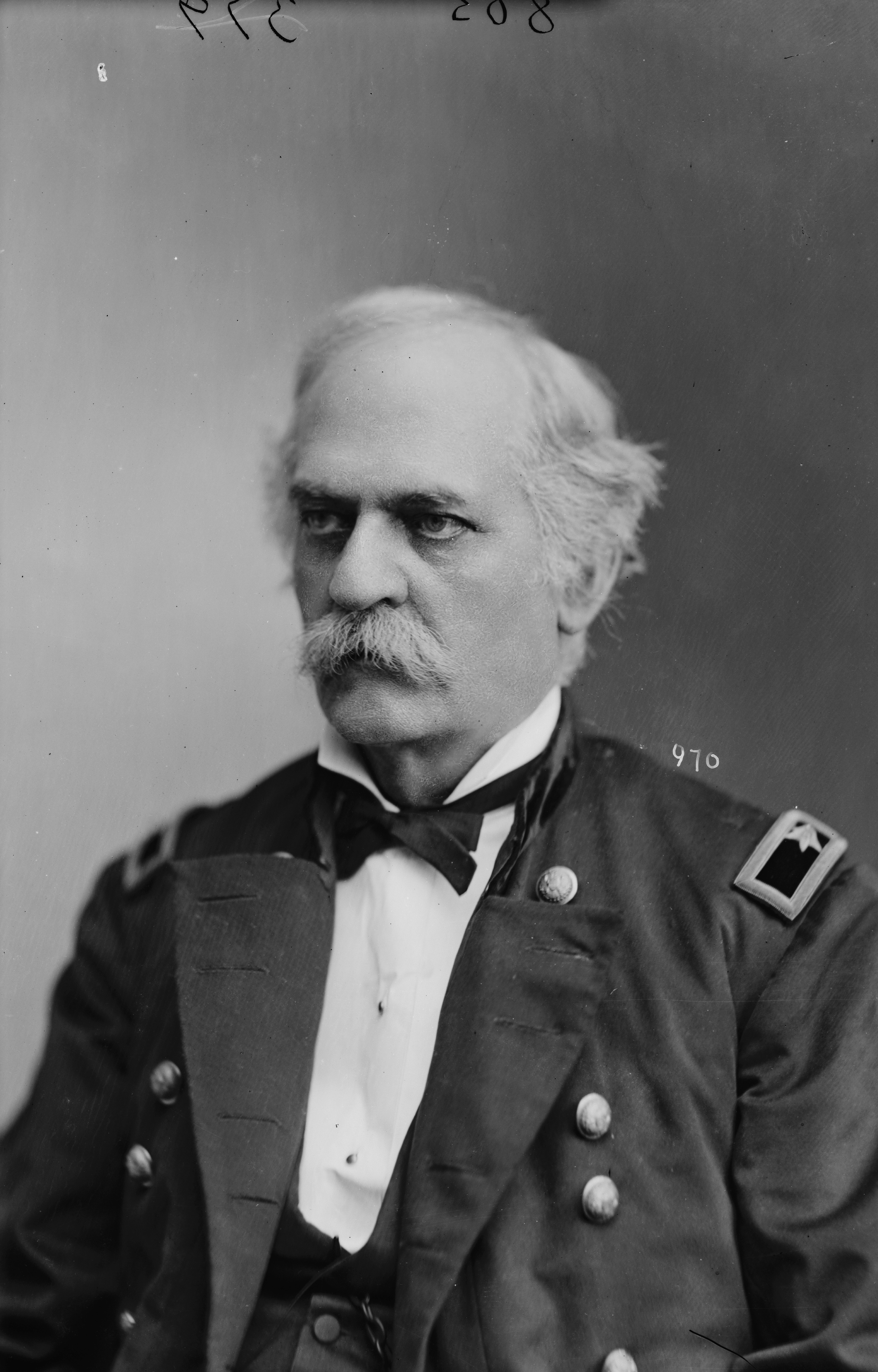
- Alvord, 1865–1880
- Born: August 18, 1813; Rutland, Vermont, United States
- Died: October 16, 1884 (aged 71); Washington, D.C., United States
- Burial place: Evergreen Cemetery, Vermont, United States
- Military career
- Allegiance: United States of America; Union
- Branch: United States Army; Union Army
- Service years: 1833–1880
- Rank: Brigadier General
- Unit: 4th U.S. Infantry
- Commands: District of Oregon; Paymaster-General of the United States Army
- Conflicts: Second Seminole War; Mexican–American War; Battle of Palo Alto; Battle of Resaca de la Palma; Battle of Paso de Ovejas; Battle of National Bridge; Battle of Cerro Gordo; Battle of Huamantla; American Civil War

Benjamin Alvord (August 18, 1813 – October 16, 1884) was an American soldier, mathematician, and botanist.

== Early life and career ==
Alvord was born in Rutland, Vermont, where he developed an interest in nature. He attended the United States Military Academy and displayed a talent in mathematics. He graduated in 1833.

He was assigned to the 4th U.S. Infantry and participated in the Seminole Wars. He returned to West Point as an assistant professor of mathematics until 1839, when he was again assigned to the 4th Infantry. He spent 21 years of his military career with that regiment.

He was on frontier, garrison, and engineer duty until 1846, when he participated in the military occupation of the new state of Texas. Subsequently, he served during the Mexican–American War, being brevetted successively to captain and major for gallantry in a number of important battles, including the Battle of Palo Alto and the Battle of Resaca de la Palma. He served as General Riley's chief of staff to Major Folliott T. Lally's column on the march from Vera Cruz to Mexico City in 1847. He joined the Aztec Club of 1847 in 1871.

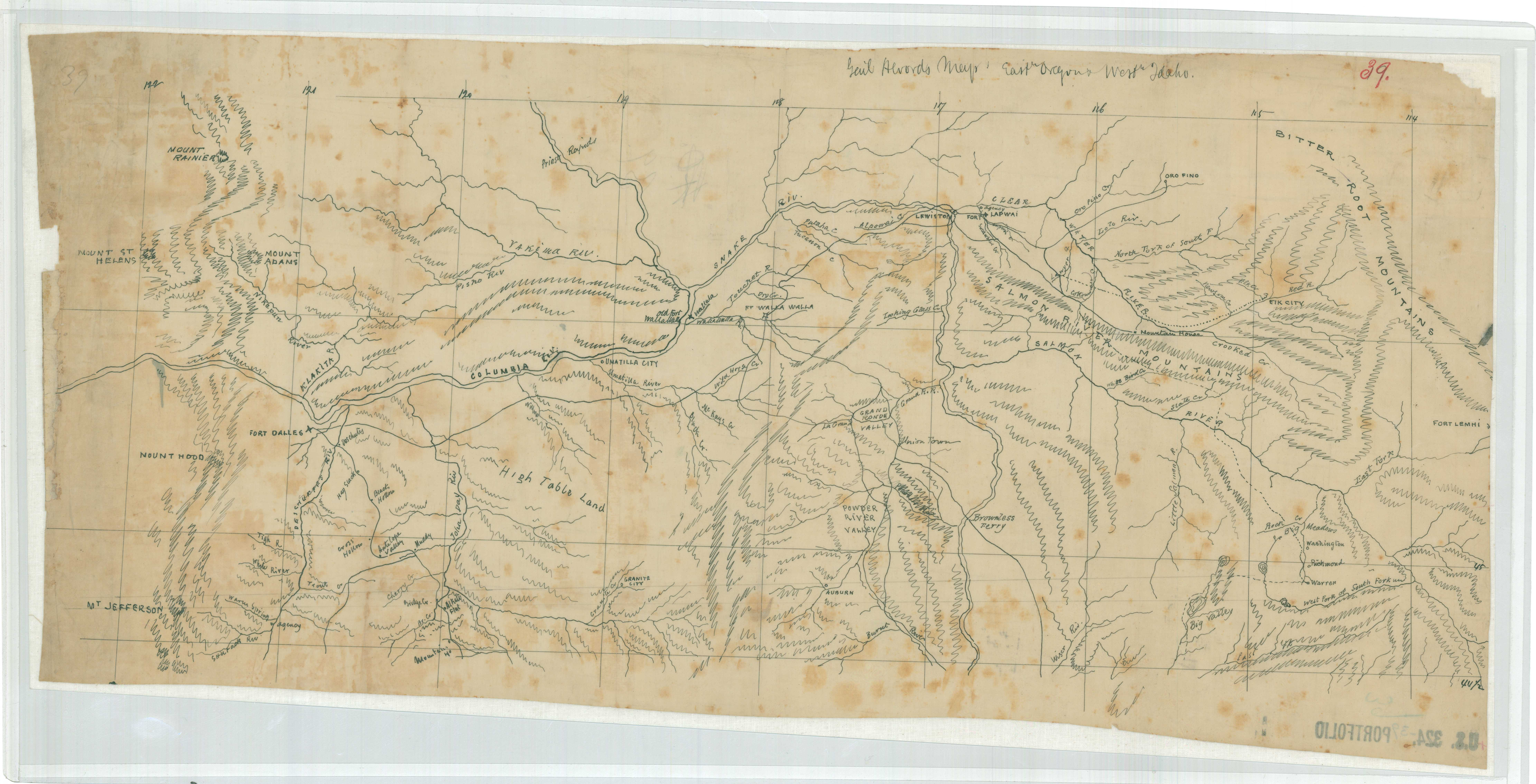
"Gen. Alvord's map" of eastern Oregon and western Idaho (NAID 93193210)

After the Mexican–American War, he went from line to staff when he was named paymaster and promoted to major. He was assigned to various posts and was sent with the 4th Infantry to the West Coast. He was the engineer in charge of building the military road in southern Oregon. He was then chief paymaster in Oregon from 1854 until 1862.

== Civil War service ==
From 1862 to 1865, during the American Civil War, Alvord was at Fort Vancouver as the commander of the District of Oregon with the rank of brigadier general of volunteers. He was named to that post by George Wright, the commanding officer of the Department of the Pacific. Wright wanted an experienced Regular Army officer in that post, rather than a volunteer, since the District was large (encompassing the present-day states of Oregon, Washington, and Idaho), underdeveloped, and had a history of friction between the native peoples and settlers. As commander of the District, Alvord built up the defenses around the mouth of the Columbia River, but was unable to do the same for Puget Sound. Because of low enlistments from Oregon and Washington, he supported the military draft, and failing that, supported the payment of bounties. He was removed from command in March 1865. He was ordered to the East Coast, where he resigned his volunteer commission and became paymaster in New York City.

== Circles and spheres ==
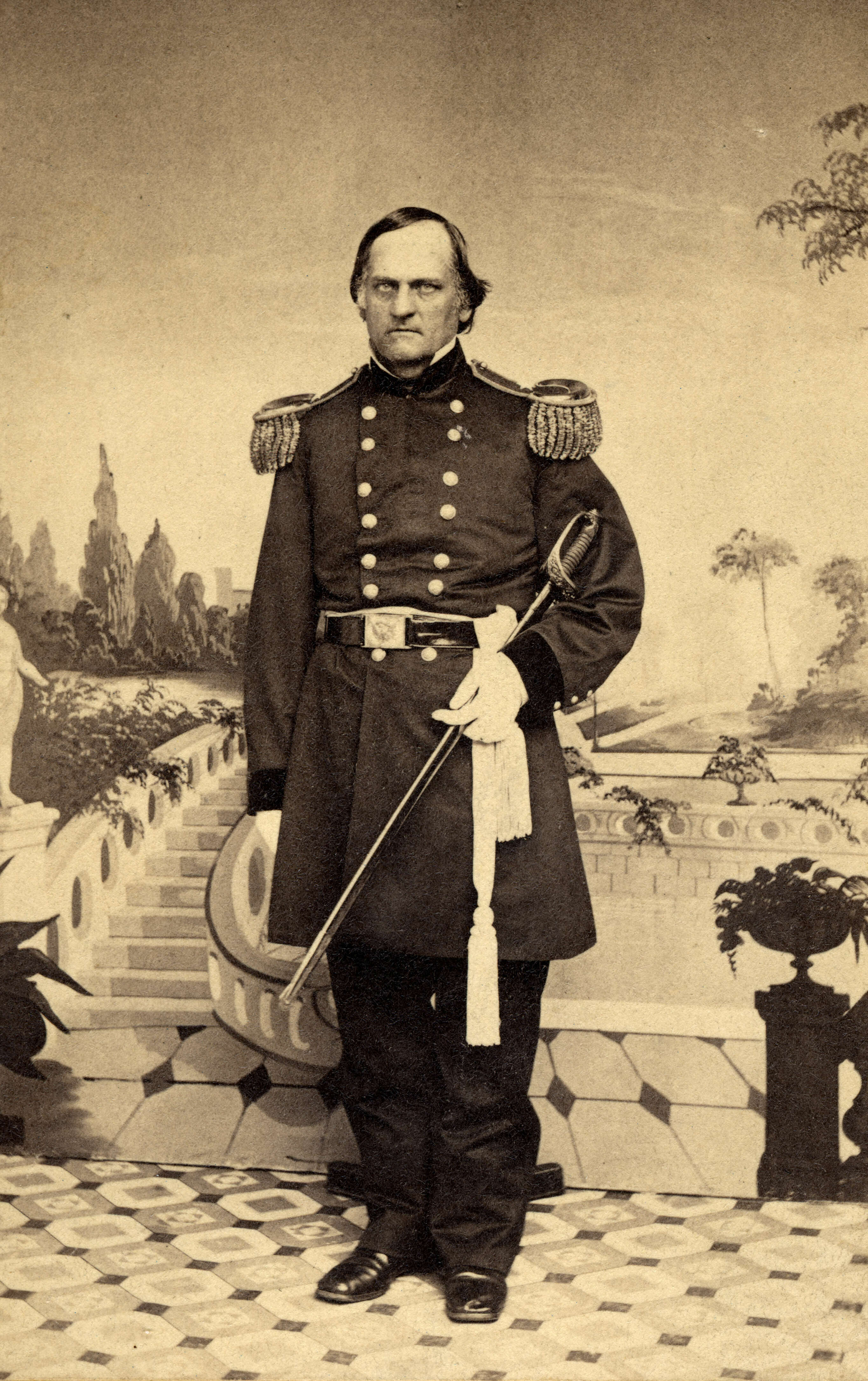
Brigadier General Benjamin Alvord, Commander of the Department of Oregon, 1860s

Alvord was interested in the classical problem of Apollonius, to find a circle tangent to three given circles, and the special cases of Apollonius' problem, as well as the generalization to spheres. In 1855, he published in Smithsonian Contributions to Knowledge.

Posted to the remote Fort Vancouver, he continued his investigations and submitted his findings in 1860, but was frustrated by a fire. In 1882, when he found that there are 96 circles which cut four given circles at a fixed angle and there are 640 spheres which cut five given spheres at a fixed angle, he assembled all his results for an article in American Journal of Mathematics, where he explained the delay:

All of this memoir, except the last two problems, were completed and sent to the Smithsonian Institute [sic] in January 1860, from Fort Vancouver, Washington Territory, but the manuscript was burned in January 1865 when the upper story of the Smithsonian building was on fire.

The article is graced with annotations by Arthur Cayley and the concession that Darboux had preceded Alvord in print.

== Postbellum ==
After the war, he subsequently became paymaster of the District of Omaha and paymaster of the Department of the Platte. He became Paymaster General of the Army in 1872 and served in that capacity until his retirement from active service in 1880, when he was succeeded by Nathan W. Brown. He was promoted to brigadier general in 1876.

He also wrote on natural history, writing the first scientific description of the ability of the compass plant (Silphium laciniatum) to orient itself in a north-south direction, as well as writing about winter grazing in the Rocky Mountains. Alvord was a contributor to Harper's Magazine, and a member of the Literary Society of Washington.

== Personal life and family ==
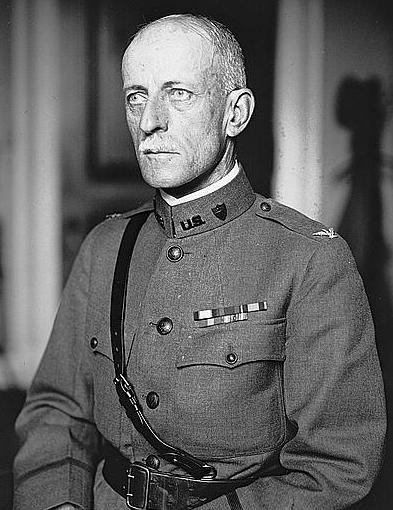
Benjamin Alvord Jr

He married Emily Louise Mussey in 1846, and they had six children. His son, Benjamin Alvord, Jr., became a soldier and was a general in World War I. His daughter Louise married Thomas Craig, one of the main professors of mathematics at Johns Hopkins University during its first two decades.

== Death and legacy ==
He died on October 16, 1884 in Washington, D.C. He and his wife Emily Louise Mussey (1826–1885) are buried at Evergreen Cemetery, Rutland, Vermont, Section 4, Lot 4.

Alvord Valley and the Alvord Desert in Oregon were named in his honor.

== See also ==
- List of American Civil War generals (Union)
