= Apollonius point =

Triangle center

In Euclidean geometry, the Apollonius point is a triangle center designated as X(181) in Clark Kimberling's Encyclopedia of Triangle Centers (ETC). It is defined as the point of concurrence of the three line segments joining each vertex of the triangle to the points of tangency formed by the opposing excircle and a larger circle that is tangent to all three excircles.

In the literature, the term "Apollonius points" has also been used to refer to the isodynamic points of a triangle. This usage could also be justified on the ground that the isodynamic points are related to the three Apollonian circles associated with a triangle.

The solution of the Apollonius problem has been known for centuries. But the Apollonius point was first noted in 1987.

== Definition ==
Extended sides of triangle △ABC Excircles E_{A}, E_{B}, E_{C} Apollonius circle of △ABC Lines AA', BB', CC': concur at the Apollonius point

The Apollonius point of a triangle is defined as follows.

Let △ABC be any given triangle. Let the excircles of △ABC opposite to the vertices A, B, C be E_{A}, E_{B}, E_{C} respectively. Let E be the circle which touches the three excircles E_{A}, E_{B}, E_{C} such that the three excircles are within E. Let A', B', C' be the points of contact of the circle E with the three excircles. The lines AA', BB', CC' are concurrent. The point of concurrence is the Apollonius point of △ABC.

The Apollonius problem is the problem of constructing a circle tangent to three given circles in a plane. In general, there are eight circles touching three given circles. The circle E referred to in the above definition is one of these eight circles touching the three excircles of triangle △ABC. In Encyclopedia of Triangle Centers the circle E is the called the Apollonius circle of △ABC.

== Trilinear coordinates ==
The trilinear coordinates of the Apollonius point are
$$\frac{a(b + c)^2}{b + c - a} : \frac{b(c + a)^2}{c + a - b} : \frac{c(a + b)^2}{a + b - c}$$
$$= \sin^2\! A \, \cos^2\! \frac{B - C}{2} : \sin^2\! B \, \cos^2\! \frac{C - A}{2} : \sin^2\! C \, \cos^2\! \frac{A - B}{2}.$$

== See also ==
- Apollonius' theorem
- Apollonius of Perga (262–190 BC), geometer and astronomer
- Apollonius problem
- Apollonian circles
- Isodynamic point of a triangle
