= Orthogonal circles =

Circles whose tangent lines at the points of intersection are perpendicular

Three mutually orthogonal circles

In geometry, two circles are said to be orthogonal if their respective tangent lines at the points of intersection are perpendicular (meet at a right angle).

A straight line through a circle's center is orthogonal to it. Straight lines may also considered as a kind of generalized circles, for instance in inversive geometry. An orthogonal pair of lines or line and circle are orthogonal generalized circles. Straight lines are the only generalized circles that pass through the center of a circle to which they are orthogonal.

In the conformal disk model of the hyperbolic plane, every geodesic is an arc of a generalized circle orthogonal to the circle of ideal points bounding the disk.

The composition of two circle inversions, first across one circle then across a different circle, commutes (is the same in either order) if and only if the two circles are orthogonal.

== See also ==
- Orthogonality
- Radical axis
- Power center (geometry)
- Apollonian circles
- Bipolar coordinates
