= Circles of Apollonius =

Several sets of circles associated with Apollonius of Perga

The circles of Apollonius are any of several sets of circles associated with Apollonius of Perga, a renowned Greek geometer. Most of these circles are found in planar Euclidean geometry, but analogs have been defined on other surfaces; for example, counterparts on the surface of a sphere can be defined through stereographic projection.

The main uses of this term are fivefold:

1. Apollonius showed that a circle can be defined as the set of points in a plane that have a specified ratio of distances to two fixed points, known as foci. This Apollonian circle is the basis of the Apollonius pursuit problem. It is a particular case of the first family described in #2.
2. The Apollonian circles are two families of mutually orthogonal circles. The first family consists of the circles with all possible distance ratios to two fixed foci (the same circles as in #1), whereas the second family consists of all possible circles that pass through both foci. These circles form the basis of bipolar coordinates.
3. The circles of Apollonius of a triangle are three circles, each of which passes through one vertex of the triangle and maintains a constant ratio of distances to the other two. The isodynamic points and Lemoine line of a triangle can be solved using these circles of Apollonius.
4. Apollonius's problem is to construct circles that are simultaneously tangent to three specified circles. The solutions to this problem are sometimes called the circles of Apollonius.
5. The Apollonian gasket—one of the first fractals ever described—is a set of mutually tangent circles, formed by solving Apollonius's problem iteratively.

== Apollonius's definition of a circle ==
Apollonius's definition of a circle

A circle is usually defined as the set of points P at a given distance r (the circle's radius) from a given point (the circle's center). However, there are other, equivalent definitions of a circle. Apollonius discovered that a circle could be defined as the set of points P that have a given ratio of distances k = d_{1}/d_{2} to two given points (labeled A and B in the figure). These two points are sometimes called the foci.

=== Proof using vectors in Euclidean spaces ===
Let d_{1}, d_{2} be non-equal positive real numbers. Let C be the internal division point of AB in the ratio d_{1} : d_{2} and D the external division point of AB in the same ratio, d_{1} : d_{2}.

$$\overrightarrow{PC} = \frac{d_2\overrightarrow{PA} + d_1\overrightarrow{PB}}{d_2 + d_1},\quad
\overrightarrow{PD} = \frac{d_2\overrightarrow{PA} - d_1\overrightarrow{PB}}{d_2 - d_1}.$$

Then,
$$\begin{align}
&PA : PB = d_1 : d_2. \\
\Leftrightarrow{}& d_2|\overrightarrow{PA}| = d_1|\overrightarrow{PB}|. \\
\Leftrightarrow{}& d_2^2|\overrightarrow{PA}|^2 = d_1^2|\overrightarrow{PB}|^2. \\
\Leftrightarrow{}& (d_2\overrightarrow{PA} + d_1\overrightarrow{PB})\cdot (d_2\overrightarrow{PA} - d_1\overrightarrow{PB}) = 0. \\
\Leftrightarrow{}& \frac{d_2\overrightarrow{PA} + d_1\overrightarrow{PB}}{d_2 + d_1}\cdot \frac{d_2\overrightarrow{PA} - d_1\overrightarrow{PB}}{d_2 - d_1} = 0. \\
\Leftrightarrow{}& \overrightarrow{PC} \cdot \overrightarrow{PD} = 0. \\
\Leftrightarrow{}& \overrightarrow{PC} = \vec{0} \vee \overrightarrow{PD} = \vec{0} \vee \overrightarrow{PC} \perp \overrightarrow{PD}. \\
\Leftrightarrow{}& P = C \vee P = D \vee \angle CPD = 90^\circ.
\end{align}$$

Therefore, the point P is on the circle which has the diameter CD.

=== Proof using the angle bisector theorem ===
Proof of Apollonius's definition of a circle

First consider the point C on the line segment between A and B, satisfying the ratio. By the definition
$$\frac{|AP|}{|BP|}=\frac{|AC|}{|BC|}$$
and from the converse of the angle bisector theorem, the angles α = ∠ APC and β = ∠CPB are equal.

Next take the other point D on the extended line AB that satisfies the ratio. So
$$\frac{|AP|}{|BP|}=\frac{|AD|}{|BD|}.$$
Also take some other point Q anywhere on the extended line AP. Again by the converse of the angle bisector theorem, the line PD bisects the exterior angle ∠QPB. Hence, γ = ∠ BPD and δ = ∠ QPD are equal and β + γ = 90°. Hence by Thales's theorem P lies on the circle which has C̅D̅ as a diameter.

=== Apollonius pursuit problem ===
The Apollonius pursuit problem is one of finding whether a ship leaving from one point A at speed v_{A} will intercept another ship leaving a different point B at speed v_{B}. The minimum time in interception of the two ships is calculated by means of straight-line paths. If the ships' speeds are held constant, their speed ratio is defined by μ. If both ships collide or meet at a future point, I, then the distances of each are related by the equation:

$$a = \mu b$$

With the distances in question being:

$$\begin{align}
a &= \sqrt{x^2 + y^2} \\
b &= \sqrt{(d-x)^2 + y^2}
\end{align}$$

Substituting in a and b and squaring both sides, we obtain:

$$\begin{align}
a^2 &= \mu^2 b^2 \\
x^2 + y^2 &= \mu^2 \left[(d-x)^2 + y^2 \right] \\
&= \mu^2 \left[d^2 + x^2 - 2dx + y^2 \right] \\
&= x^2 \mu^2 + y^2\mu^2 + d^2\mu^2 - 2dx \mu^2
\end{align}$$

Bringing to the left-hand side:
$$x^2 - x^2\mu^2 + y^2 - y^2\mu^2 - d^2\mu^2 + 2dx\mu^2 = 0$$

Factoring:
$$x^2(1-\mu^2) + y^2(1-\mu^2) - d^2\mu^2 + 2dx\mu^2 = 0$$

Dividing by $1-\mu^2$ :
$$x^2 + y^2 - \frac{d^2\mu^2}{1-\mu^2} + \frac{2dx\mu^2}{1-\mu^2} = 0$$

Completing the square:
$$\left(x+ \frac{d\mu^2}{1-\mu^2}\right)^2- \frac{d^2\mu^4}{(1-\mu^2)^2} - \frac{d^2 \mu^2}{1-\mu^2} + y^2 = 0$$

Bring non-squared terms to the right-hand side:
$$\begin{align}
\left( x + \frac{d\mu^2}{1-\mu^2} \right)^2 + y^2
&= \frac{d^2\mu^4}{(1-\mu^2)^2} + \frac{d^2 \mu^2}{1-\mu^2}\\[2pt]
&= \frac{d^2 \mu^4}{(1-\mu^2)^2} + \frac{d^2 \mu^2}{1-\mu^2} \frac{(1-\mu^2)}{(1-\mu^2)}\\[2pt]
&= \frac{d^2\mu^4+d^2\mu^2-d^2\mu^4}{(1-\mu^2)^2}\\[2pt]
&= \frac{d^2 \mu^2}{(1-\mu^2)^2}
\end{align}$$

Then:
$$\left( x + \frac{d\mu^2}{1-\mu^2}\right)^2 + y^2 = \left( \frac{d \mu}{1-\mu^2} \right)^2$$

Therefore, the point must lie on a circle as defined by Apollonius, with their starting points as the foci.

== Circles sharing a radical axis ==
A set of Apollonian circles. Every blue circle intersects every red circle at a right angle, and vice versa. Every red circle passes through the two foci, which correspond to points A and B in the figure above.

The circles defined by the Apollonian pursuit problem for the same two points A and B, but with varying ratios of the two speeds, are disjoint from each other and form a continuous family that cover the entire plane; this family of circles is known as a hyperbolic pencil. Another family of circles, the circles that pass through both A and B, are also called a pencil, or more specifically an elliptic pencil. These two pencils of Apollonian circles intersect each other at right angles and form the basis of the bipolar coordinate system. Within each pencil, any two circles have the same radical axis; the two radical axes of the two pencils are perpendicular, and the centers of the circles from one pencil lie on the radical axis of the other pencil.

== Solutions to Apollonius's problem ==
Apollonius's problem may have up to eight solutions. The three given circles are shown in black, whereas the solution circles are colored.

In Euclidean plane geometry, Apollonius's problem is to construct circles that are tangent to three given circles in a plane.

Three given circles generically have eight different circles that are tangent to them, in four conjugate pairs. Each pair corresponds to one of the four ways of partitioning the three given circles into two subsets, separated from each other by the tangent circle.

== Apollonian gasket ==
A symmetrical Apollonian gasket, also called the Leibniz packing, after its inventor Gottfried Leibniz

By solving Apollonius's problem repeatedly to find the inscribed circle, the interstices between mutually tangential circles can be filled arbitrarily finely, forming an Apollonian gasket, also known as a Leibniz packing or an Apollonian packing. This gasket is a fractal, being self-similar and having a dimension d that is not known exactly but is roughly 1.3, which is higher than that of a regular (or rectifiable) curve (d = 1) but less than that of a plane (d = 2). The Apollonian gasket was first described by Gottfried Leibniz in the 17th century, and is a curved precursor of the 20th-century Sierpiński triangle. The Apollonian gasket also has deep connections to other fields of mathematics; for example, it is the limit set of Kleinian groups; see also Circle packing theorem.

== Isodynamic points of a triangle ==
The circles of Apollonius may also denote three special circles $\mathcal{C}_{1},\mathcal{C}_{2},\mathcal{C}_{3}$ defined by an arbitrary triangle $\mathrm{A_{1}A_{2}A_{3}}$. The circle $\mathcal{C}_{1}$ is defined as the unique circle passing through the triangle vertex $\mathrm{A_{1}}$ that maintains a constant ratio of distances to the other two vertices $\mathrm{A_{2}}$ and $\mathrm{A_{3}}$ (cf. Apollonius's definition of the circle above). Similarly, the circle $\mathcal{C}_{2}$ is defined as the unique circle passing through the triangle vertex $\mathrm{A_{2}}$ that maintains a constant ratio of distances to the other two vertices $\mathrm{A_{1}}$ and $\mathrm{A_{3}}$, and so on for the circle $\mathcal{C}_{3}$.

All three circles intersect the circumcircle of the triangle orthogonally. All three circles pass through two points, which are known as the isodynamic points $S$ and $S^{\prime}$ of the triangle. The line connecting these common intersection points is the radical axis for all three circles. The two isodynamic points are inverses of each other relative to the circumcircle of the triangle.

The centers of these three circles fall on a single line (the Lemoine line). This line is perpendicular to the radical axis, which is the line determined by the isodynamic points.

== See also ==
- Apollonius point
- Ellipse

== Bibliography ==
- Ogilvy, C.S. (1990) Excursions in Geometry, Dover. ISBN 0-486-26530-7.
- Johnson, R.A. (1960) Advanced Euclidean Geometry, Dover.
