= Power center =

Power center may refer to:

- Power center (geometry), the intersection point of the three radical axes of the pairs of circles
- Power center (retail), an unenclosed shopping center with 250,000 square feet (23,000 m^{2}) to 750,000 square feet (70,000 m^{2}) of gross leasable area

== See also ==
- Power station
