= Special cases of Apollonius' problem =

Construct all the circles that are tangent to three given circles

In Euclidean geometry, Apollonius' problem is to construct all the circles that are tangent to three given circles. Special cases of Apollonius' problem are those in which at least one of the given circles is a point or line, i.e., is a circle of zero or infinite radius. The nine types of such limiting cases of Apollonius' problem are to construct the circles tangent to:

1. three points (denoted PPP, generally 1 solution)
2. three lines (denoted LLL, generally 4 solutions)
3. one line and two points (denoted LPP, generally 2 solutions)
4. two lines and a point (denoted LLP, generally 2 solutions)
5. one circle and two points (denoted CPP, generally 2 solutions)
6. one circle, one line, and a point (denoted CLP, generally 4 solutions)
7. two circles and a point (denoted CCP, generally 4 solutions)
8. one circle and two lines (denoted CLL, generally 8 solutions)
9. two circles and a line (denoted CCL, generally 8 solutions)

In a different type of limiting case, the three given geometrical elements may have a special arrangement, such as constructing a circle tangent to two parallel lines and one circle.

== Historical introduction ==
Like most branches of mathematics, Euclidean geometry is concerned with proofs of general truths from a minimum of postulates. For example, a simple proof would show that at least two angles of an isosceles triangle are equal. One important type of proof in Euclidean geometry is to show that a geometrical object can be constructed with a compass and an unmarked straightedge; an object can be constructed if and only if (iff) (something about no higher than square roots are taken). Therefore, it is important to determine whether an object can be constructed with compass and straightedge and, if so, how it may be constructed.

Euclid developed numerous constructions with compass and straightedge. Examples include: regular polygons such as the pentagon and hexagon, a line parallel to another that passes through a given point, etc. Many rose windows in Gothic Cathedrals, as well as some Celtic knots, can be designed using only Euclidean constructions. However, some geometrical constructions are not possible with those tools, including the heptagon and trisecting an angle.

Apollonius contributed many constructions, namely, finding the circles that are tangent to three geometrical elements simultaneously, where the "elements" may be a point, line or circle.

== Rules of Euclidean constructions ==
In Euclidean constructions, five operations are allowed:

1. Draw a line through two points
2. Draw a circle through a point with a given center
3. Find the intersection point of two lines
4. Find the intersection points of two circles
5. Find the intersection points of a line and a circle

The initial elements in a geometric construction are called the "givens", such as a given point, a given line or a given circle.

=== Example 1: Perpendicular bisector ===
To construct the perpendicular bisector of the line segment between two points requires two circles, each centered on an endpoint and passing through the other endpoint (operation 2). The intersection points of these two circles (operation 4) are equidistant from the endpoints. The line through them (operation 1) is the perpendicular bisector.

=== Example 2: Angle bisector ===
To generate the line that bisects the angle between two given rays requires a circle of arbitrary radius centered on the intersection point P of the two lines (2). The intersection points of this circle with the two given lines (5) are T1 and T2. Two circles of the same radius, centered on T1 and T2, intersect at points P and Q. The line through P and Q (1) is an angle bisector. Rays have one angle bisector; lines have two, perpendicular to one another.

== Preliminary results ==
A few basic results are helpful in solving special cases of Apollonius' problem. Note that a line and a point can be thought of as circles of infinitely large and infinitely small radius, respectively.

- A circle is tangent to a point if it passes through the point, and tangent to a line if they intersect at a single point P or if the line is perpendicular to a radius drawn from the circle's center to P.
- Circles tangent to two given points must lie on the perpendicular bisector.
- Circles tangent to two given lines must lie on the angle bisector.
- Tangent line to a circle from a given point draw semicircle centered on the midpoint between the center of the circle and the given point.
- Power of a point and the harmonic mean
- The radical axis of two circles is the set of points of equal tangents, or more generally, equal power.
- Circles may be inverted into lines and circles into circles.
- If two circles are internally tangent, they remain so if their radii are increased or decreased by the same amount. Conversely, if two circles are externally tangent, they remain so if their radii are changed by the same amount in opposite directions, one increasing and the other decreasing.

== Types of solutions ==
=== Type 1: Three points ===
PPP problems generally have a single solution. As shown above, if a circle passes through two given points P_{1} and P_{2}, its center must lie somewhere on the perpendicular bisector line of the two points. Therefore, if the solution circle passes through three given points P_{1}, P_{2} and P_{3}, its center must lie on the perpendicular bisectors of $\overline{\mathbf{P}_{1}\mathbf{P}_{2}}$, $\overline{\mathbf{P}_{1}\mathbf{P}_{3}}$ and $\overline{\mathbf{P}_{2}\mathbf{P}_{3}}$. At least two of these bisectors must intersect, and their intersection point is the center of the solution circle. The radius of the solution circle is the distance from that center to any one of the three given points.

=== Type 2: Three lines ===
LLL problems generally offer 4 solutions. As shown above, if a circle is tangent to two given lines, its center must lie on one of the two lines that bisect the angle between the two given lines. Therefore, if a circle is tangent to three given lines L_{1}, L_{2}, and L_{3}, its center C must be located at the intersection of the bisecting lines of the three given lines. In general, there are four such points, giving four different solutions for the LLL Apollonius problem. The radius of each solution is determined by finding a point of tangency T, which may be done by choosing one of the three intersection points P between the given lines; and drawing a circle centered on the midpoint of C and P of diameter equal to the distance between C and P. The intersections of that circle with the intersecting given lines are the two points of tangency.

=== Type 3: One point, two lines ===
PLL problems generally have 2 solutions. As shown above, if a circle is tangent to two given lines, its center must lie on one of the two lines that bisect the angle between the two given lines. By symmetry, if such a circle passes through a given point P, it must also pass through a point Q that is the "mirror image" of P about the angle bisector. The two solution circles pass through both P and Q, and their radical axis is the line connecting those two points. Consider point G at which the radical axis intersects one of the two given lines. Since, every point on the radical axis has the same power relative to each circle, the distances $\overline{\mathbf{GT}_{1}}$ and $\overline{\mathbf{GT}_{2}}$ to the solution tangent points T_{1} and T_{2}, are equal to each other and to the product

$$\overline{\mathbf{GP}} \cdot \overline{\mathbf{GQ}} =
\overline{\mathbf{GT}_{1}} \cdot \overline{\mathbf{GT}_{1}} =
\overline{\mathbf{GT}_{2}} \cdot \overline{\mathbf{GT}_{2}}$$

Thus, the distances $\overline{\mathbf{GT}_{1-2}}$ are both equal to the geometric mean of $\overline{\mathbf{GP}}$ and $\overline{\mathbf{GQ}}$. From G and this distance, the tangent points T_{1} and T_{2} can be found. Then, the two solution circles are the circles that pass through the three points (P, Q, T_{1}) and (P, Q, T_{2}), respectively.

=== Type 4: Two points, one line ===
PPL problems generally have 2 solutions. If a line m drawn through the given points P and Q is parallel to the given line l, the tangent point T of the circle with l is located at the intersection of the perpendicular bisector of $\overline{PQ}$ with l. In that case, the sole solution circle is the circle that passes through the three points P, Q and T.

If the line m is not parallel to the given line l, then it intersects l at a point G. By the power of a point theorem, the distance from G to a tangent point T must equal the geometric mean

$$\overline{\mathbf{GT}} \cdot \overline{\mathbf{GT}} =
\overline{\mathbf{GP}} \cdot \overline{\mathbf{GQ}}$$

Two points on the given line L are located at a distance $\overline{\mathbf{GT}}$ from the point G, which may be denoted as T_{1} and T_{2}. The two solution circles are the circles that pass through the three points (P, Q, T_{1}) and (P, Q, T_{2}), respectively.

==== Compass and straightedge construction ====
The two circles in the Two points, one line problem where the line through P and Q is not parallel to the given line l, can be constructed with compass and straightedge by:

- Draw the line m through the given points P and Q .
- The point G is where the lines l and m intersect
- Draw circle C that has PQ as diameter.
- Draw one of the tangents from G to circle C.
- point A is where the tangent and the circle touch.
- Draw circle D with center G through A.
- Circle D cuts line l at the points T1 and T2.
- One of the required circles is the circle through P, Q and T1.
- The other circle is the circle through P, Q and T2.

The fastest construction (if intersections of l with both (PQ) and the central perpendicular to [PQ] are available; based on Gergonne’s approach).

- Draw a line m through P and Q intersecting l at G.
- Draw a perpendicular n through the middle of [PQ] intersecting l at O.
- Draw a circle w centered at O with radius |OP|=|OQ|.
- Draw a circle W with [OG] as a diameter intersecting w at M1 and M2.
- Draw a circle v centered at G with radius |GM1|=|GM2| intersecting l at T1 and T2.
- The circles passing through P, Q, T1 and P, Q, T2 are solutions.

The universal construction (if intersections of l with either (PQ) or the central perpendicular to [PQ] are unavailable or do not exist).

- Draw a perpendicular n through the middle of [PQ] (point R).
- Draw a perpendicular k to l through P or Q intersecting l at K.
- Draw a circle w centered at R with radius |RK|.
- Draw two lines n1 and n2 passing through P and Q parallel to n and intersecting w at points A1, A2 and B1, B2, respectively.
- Draw two lines (A1B1) and (A2B2) intersecting l at T1 and T2, respectively.
- The circles passing through P, Q, T1 and P, Q, T2 are solutions.

=== Type 5: One circle, two points ===
CPP problems generally have 2 solutions. Consider a circle centered on one given point P that passes through the second point, Q. Since the solution circle must pass through P, inversion in this circle transforms the solution circle into a line lambda. The same inversion transforms Q into itself, and (in general) the given circle C into another circle c. Thus, the problem becomes that of finding a solution line that passes through Q and is tangent to c, which was solved above; there are two such lines. Re-inversion produces the two corresponding solution circles of the original problem.

=== Type 6: One circle, one line, one point ===
CLP problems generally have 4 solutions. The solution of this special case is similar to that of the CPP Apollonius solution. Draw a circle centered on the given point P; since the solution circle must pass through P, inversion in this circle transforms the solution circle into a line lambda. In general, the same inversion transforms the given line L and given circle C into two new circles, c_{1} and c_{2}. Thus, the problem becomes that of finding a solution line tangent to the two inverted circles, which was solved above. There are four such lines, and re-inversion transforms them into the four solution circles of the Apollonius problem.

=== Type 7: Two circles, one point ===
CCP problems generally have 4 solutions. The solution of this special case is similar to that of CPP. Draw a circle centered on the given point P; since the solution circle must pass through P, inversion in this circle transforms the solution circle into a line lambda. In general, the same inversion transforms the given circle C_{1} and C_{2} into two new circles, c_{1} and c_{2}. Thus, the problem becomes that of finding a solution line tangent to the two inverted circles, which was solved above. There are four such lines, and re-inversion transforms them into the four solution circles of the original Apollonius problem.

=== Type 8: One circle, two lines ===
CLL problems generally have 8 solutions. This special case is solved most easily using scaling. The given circle is shrunk to a point, and the radius of the solution circle is either decreased by the same amount (if an internally tangent solution) or increased (if an externally tangent circle). Depending on whether the solution circle is increased or decreased in radii, the two given lines are displaced parallel to themselves by the same amount, depending on which quadrant the center of the solution circle falls. This shrinking of the given circle to a point reduces the problem to the PLL problem, solved above. In general, there are two such solutions per quadrant, giving eight solutions in all.

=== Type 9: Two circles, one line ===
CCL problems generally have 8 solutions. The solution of this special case is similar to CLL. The smaller circle is shrunk to a point, while adjusting the radii of the larger given circle and any solution circle, and displacing the line parallel to itself, according to whether they are internally or externally tangent to the smaller circle. This reduces the problem to CLP. Each CLP problem has four solutions, as described above, and there are two such problems, depending on whether the solution circle is internally or externally tangent to the smaller circle.

== Special cases with no solutions ==
An Apollonius problem is impossible if the given circles are nested, i.e., if one circle is completely enclosed within a particular circle and the remaining circle is completely excluded. This follows because any solution circle would have to cross over the middle circle to move from its tangency to the inner circle to its tangency with the outer circle. This general result has several special cases when the given circles are shrunk to points (zero radius) or expanded to straight lines (infinite radius). For example, the CCL problem has zero solutions if the two circles are on opposite sides of the line since, in that case, any solution circle would have to cross the given line non-tangentially to go from the tangent point of one circle to that of the other.

== See also ==
- Problem of Apollonius
- Compass and straightedge constructions
