= Isodynamic point =

2 points about which a triangle can be inverted into an equilateral triangle

Circles of Apollonius; isodynamic points S and S' at their intersections Interior angle bisectors, used to construct the circles Exterior angle bisectors, also used to construct the circles

In Euclidean geometry, the isodynamic points of a triangle are points associated with the triangle, with the properties that an inversion centered at one of these points transforms the given triangle into an equilateral triangle, and that the distances from the isodynamic point to the triangle vertices are inversely proportional to the opposite side lengths of the triangle. Triangles that are similar to each other have isodynamic points in corresponding locations in the plane, so the isodynamic points are triangle centers, and unlike other triangle centers the isodynamic points are also invariant under Möbius transformations. A triangle that is itself equilateral has a unique isodynamic point, at its centroid(as well as its orthocenter, its incenter, and its circumcenter, which are concurrent); every non-equilateral triangle has two isodynamic points. Isodynamic points were first studied and named by Joseph Neuberg (1885).

== Distance ratios ==
The isodynamic points were originally defined from certain equalities of ratios (or equivalently of products) of distances between pairs of points. If $S$ and $S'$ are the isodynamic points of a triangle $ABC,$ then the three products of distances $AS\cdot BC=BS\cdot AC=CS\cdot AB$ are equal. The analogous equalities also hold for $S'.$ Equivalently to the product formula, the distances $AS,$ $BS,$ and $CS$ are inversely proportional to the corresponding triangle side lengths $BC,$ $AC,$ and $AB.$

$S$ and $S'$ are the common intersection points of the three circles of Apollonius associated with triangle of a triangle $ABC,$ the three circles that each pass through one vertex of the triangle and maintain a constant ratio of distances to the other two vertices. Hence, line $SS'$ is the common radical axis for each of the three pairs of circles of Apollonius. The perpendicular bisector of line segment $SS'$ is the Lemoine line, which contains the three centers of the circles of Apollonius.

== Transformations ==
The isodynamic points $S$ and $S'$ of a triangle $ABC$ may also be defined by their properties with respect to transformations of the plane, and particularly with respect to inversions and Möbius transformations (products of multiple inversions). Inversion of the triangle $ABC$ with respect to an isodynamic point transforms the original triangle into an equilateral triangle. Inversion with respect to the circumcircle of triangle $ABC$ leaves the triangle invariant but transforms one isodynamic point into the other one. More generally, the isodynamic points are equivariant under Möbius transformations: the unordered pair of isodynamic points of a transformation of $ABC$ is equal to the same transformation applied to the pair $\{S,S'\}.$ The individual isodynamic points are fixed by Möbius transformations that map the interior of the circumcircle of $ABC$ to the interior of the circumcircle of the transformed triangle, and swapped by transformations that exchange the interior and exterior of the circumcircle.

== Angles ==
Three circles, each making angles of π/3 with the circumcircle and each other, meet at the first isodynamic point.

As well as being the intersections of the circles of Apollonius, each isodynamic point is the intersection points of another triple of circles. The first isodynamic point is the intersection of three circles through the pairs of points $AB,$ $AC,$ and $BC,$ where each of these circles intersects the circumcircle of triangle $ABC$ to form a lens with apex angle 2π/3. Similarly, the second isodynamic point is the intersection of three circles that intersect the circumcircle to form lenses with apex angle π/3.

The angles formed by the first isodynamic point with the triangle vertices satisfy the equations $ASB = ACB + \pi/3,$ $ASC = ABC + \pi/3,$ and $BSC = BAC + \pi/3.$ Analogously, the angles formed by the second isodynamic point satisfy the equations$AS'B = ACB - \pi/3,$ $AS'C = ABC - \pi/3,$ and $BS'C = BAC - \pi/3.$

The pedal triangle of an isodynamic point, the triangle formed by dropping perpendiculars from $S$ to each of the three sides of triangle $ABC,$ is equilateral, as is the triangle formed by reflecting $S$ across each side of the triangle. Among all the equilateral triangles inscribed in triangle $ABC,$ the pedal triangle of the first isodynamic point is the one with minimum area.

== Additional properties ==
The isodynamic points are the isogonal conjugates of the two Fermat points of triangle $ABC,$ and vice versa.

The Neuberg cubic contains both of the isodynamic points.

If a circle is partitioned into three arcs, the first isodynamic point of the arc endpoints is the unique point inside the circle with the property that each of the three arcs is equally likely to be the first arc reached by a Brownian motion starting at that point. That is, the isodynamic point is the point for which the harmonic measure of the three arcs is equal.

Given a univariate polynomial $P(z) = z^3+az^2+bz+c$ whose zeros are the vertices of a triangle $T$ in the complex plane, the isodynamic points of $T$ are the zeros of the polynomial $I(z) = (a^2-3b)z^2 + (ab-9c)z + b^2 - 3ac.$ Note that $I(z)$ is a constant multiple of $\mathrm{Discriminant}_u(nP(u) + (z-u)P'(u)) ,$ where $n$ is the degree of $P.$ This construction generalizes isodynamic points to polynomials of degree $n\ge 3$ in the sense that the zeros of the above discriminant are invariant under Möbius transformations. Here the expression $nP(u) + (z-u)P'(u)$ is the polar derivative of $P(u)$ with pole $z.$

Equivalently, with $P$ and $n$ defined as above, the (generalized) isodynamic points of $P$ are the critical values of $f(z) = z-nP(z)/P'(z).$ Here $f(z)$ is the expression that appears in the relaxed Newton’s method with relaxation parameter $n.$ A similar construction exists for rational functions instead of polynomials.

== Construction ==
Construction of the isodynamic point from reflected copies of the given triangle and inwards-pointing equilateral triangles.

The circle of Apollonius through vertex $A$ of triangle $ABC$ may be constructed by finding the two (interior and exterior) angle bisectors of the two angles formed by lines $AB$ and $AC$ at vertex $A,$ and intersecting these bisector lines with line $BC.$ The line segment between these two intersection points is the diameter of the circle of Apollonius. The isodynamic points may be found by constructing two of these circles and finding their two intersection points.

Another compass and straight-edge construction involves finding the reflection $A'$ of vertex $A$ across line $BC$ (the intersection of circles centered at $B$ and $C$ through $A$), and constructing an equilateral triangle inwards on side $BC$ of the triangle (the apex $A''$ of this triangle is the intersection of two circles having $BC$ as their radius). The line $A'A''$ crosses the similarly constructed lines $B'B''$ and $C'C''$ at the first isodynamic point. The second isodynamic point may be constructed similarly but with the equilateral triangles erected outwards rather than inwards.

Alternatively, the position of the first isodynamic point may be calculated from its trilinear coordinates, which are
$$\sin(A + \pi/3) : \sin(B + \pi/3) : \sin(C + \pi/3).$$
The second isodynamic point uses trilinear coordinates with a similar formula involving $-\pi/3$ in place of $\pi/3.$
