= Special case =

Specific, usually well-known application of a mathematical rule or law

In logic, especially as applied in mathematics, concept A is a special case or specialization of concept B precisely if every instance of A is also an instance of B but not vice versa, or equivalently, if B is a generalization of A. A limiting case is a type of special case which is arrived at by taking some aspect of the concept to the extreme of what is permitted in the general case. If B is true, one can immediately deduce that A is true as well, and if B is false, A can also be immediately deduced to be false. A degenerate case is a special case which is in some way qualitatively different from almost all of the cases allowed.

== Examples ==
Special case examples include the following:

- All squares are rectangles (but not all rectangles are squares); therefore the square is a special case of the rectangle. It is also a special case of the rhombus.
- If an isosceles triangle is defined as a triangle with at least 2 identical angles, an equilateral triangle is therefore a special case. (However, this is not true if an authority follows a different linguistic prescription of an isosceles triangle having exactly 2 sides.)
- Fermat's Last Theorem, that a^{n} + b^{n} = c^{n} has no solutions in positive integers with n > 2, is a special case of Beal's conjecture, that a^{x} + b^{y} = c^{z} has no primitive solutions in positive integers with x, y, and z all greater than 2, specifically, the case of x = y = z.
- The unproven Riemann hypothesis is a special case of the generalized Riemann hypothesis, in the case that χ(n) = 1 for all n.
- Fermat's little theorem, which states "if p is a prime number, then for any integer a, then $a^p \equiv a \pmod p$" is a special case of Euler's theorem, which states "if n and a are coprime positive integers, and $\phi(n)$ is Euler's totient function, then $a^{\varphi (n)} \equiv 1 \pmod{n}$", in the case that n is a prime number.
- Euler's identity $e^{i \pi} = -1$ is a special case of Euler's formula which states "for any real number x: $e^{ix} = \cos x + i\sin x$", in the case that x = $\pi$.
