= Darboux =

Darboux is a surname. Notable people with the surname include:

- Jean Gaston Darboux (1842–1917), French mathematician
- Lauriane Doumbouya (née Darboux), the current First Lady of Guinea since 5 September 2021
- Paul Darboux (1919–1982), Beninese politician
