= Power center (geometry) =

For 3 circles, the intersection of the radical axes of each pair

Diagram of the radical center of three circles. Given circles Radical axis of each pair of given circles Radical center (intersection of the radical axes) Radical circle (intersects the given circles orthogonally)

In geometry, the power center of three circles, also called the radical center, is the intersection point of the three radical axes of the pairs of circles. If the radical center lies outside of all three circles, then it is the center of the unique circle (the radical circle) that intersects the three given circles orthogonally; the construction of this orthogonal circle corresponds to Monge's problem. This is a special case of the three conics theorem.

The three radical axes meet in a single point, the radical center, for the following reason. The radical axis of a pair of circles is defined as the set of points that have equal power h with respect to both circles. For example, for every point P on the radical axis of circles 1 and 2, the powers to each circle are equal: h_{1} = h_{2}. Similarly, for every point on the radical axis of circles 2 and 3, the powers must be equal, h_{2} = h_{3}. Therefore, at the intersection point of these two lines, all three powers must be equal, h_{1} = h_{2} = h_{3}. Since this implies that h_{1} = h_{3}, this point must also lie on the radical axis of circles 1 and 3. Hence, all three radical axes pass through the same point, the radical center.

The radical center has several applications in geometry. It has an important role in a solution to Apollonius' problem published by Joseph Diaz Gergonne in 1814. In the power diagram of a system of circles, all of the vertices of the diagram are located at radical centers of triples of circles. The Spieker center of a triangle is the radical center of its excircles. Several types of radical circles have been defined as well, such as the radical circle of the Lucas circles.
