= Radical axis =

All points whose relative distances to two circles are same

Two circles, centered at M_{1}, M_{2} Radical axis, with sample point P Tangential distances from both circles to P The tangent lines must be equal in length for any point on the radical axis: $|PT_1|=|PT_2|.$ If P, T_{1}, T_{2} lie on a common tangent, then P is the midpoint of $\overline{T_1T_2}.$

In Euclidean geometry, the radical axis of two non-concentric circles is the set of points whose powers with respect to the circles are equal. For this reason the radical axis is also called the power line or power bisector of the two circles. In detail:

For two circles c_{1}, c_{2} with centers M_{1}, M_{2} and radii r_{1}, r_{2} respectively, the powers of a point P with respect to the circles are

$$\Pi_1(P)=|PM_1|^2 - r_1^2,\qquad \Pi_2(P)= |PM_2|^2 - r_2^2.$$

Point P belongs to the radical axis, if

$$\Pi_1(P)=\Pi_2(P).$$

If the circles have two points in common, the radical axis is the common secant line of the circles.
If point P is outside the circles, P has equal tangential distance to the both circles.
If the radii are equal, the radical axis is the line segment bisector of M_{1}, M_{2}.
In any case the radical axis is a line perpendicular to $\overline{M_1M_2}.$

== On notations ==
The term radical axis was used by the French mathematician M. Chasles as axe radical.
J.V. Poncelet used the term chorde ideale.
J. Plücker introduced the term Chordale.
J. Steiner called the radical axis line of equal powers (German: Linie der gleichen Potenzen) which led to the term power line (Potenzgerade).

== Properties ==
=== Geometric shape and its position ===
Let $\vec x,\vec m_1,\vec m_2$ be the position vectors of the points $P,M_1,M_2$. Then the defining equation of the radical line can be written as:

$$(\vec x-\vec m_1)^2-r_1^2=(\vec x-\vec m_2)^2-r_2^2 \quad \leftrightarrow
\quad 2\vec x\cdot(\vec m_2-\vec m_1)+\vec m_1^2-\vec m_2^2+r_2^2-r_1^2=0$$

Definition and calculation of $d_1,d_2$

From the right equation one gets

- The pointset of the radical axis is indeed a line and is perpendicular to the line through the circle centers.

($\vec m_2-\vec m_1$ is a normal vector to the radical axis!)

Dividing the equation by $2|\vec m_2-\vec m_1|$, one gets the Hessian normal form. Inserting the position vectors of the centers yields the distances of the centers to the radical axis:

$$d_1 = \frac{d^2+{r_1}^2-{r_2}^2}{2d}\ ,\qquad d_2 = \frac{d^2+{r_2}^2-{r_1}^2}{2d}$$,
with $d = |M_1 M_2|=|\vec m_2-\vec m_1|$.

($d_i$ may be negative if $L$ is not between $M_1,M_2$.)

If the circles are intersecting at two points, the radical line runs through the common points. If they only touch each other, the radical line is the common tangent line.

=== Special positions ===
Radical axis: variations

- The radical axis of two intersecting circles is their common secant line.
- The radical axis of two touching circles is their common tangent.
- The radical axis of two non intersecting circles is the common secant of two convenient equipotent circles (see below Orthogonal circles).

=== Orthogonal circles ===
The touching points of the tangents through $P$ lie on the orthogonal circle (green)

- For a point $P$ in the exterior of a circle $c_i$ and the two tangent points $S_i,T_i$ the equation $|PS_i|^2=|PT_i|^2=\Pi_i(P)$ holds and $S_i,T_i$ lie on the circle $c_o$ with center $P$ and radius $\sqrt{\Pi_i(P)}$. The circle $c_o$ intersects the circles $c_i$ orthogonally. Hence:

If $P$ is a point of the radical axis, then the four points $S_1,T_1, S_2,T_2$ lie on the circle $c_o$, which intersects the given circles $c_1,c_2$ orthogonally.

- The radical axis consists of all centers of circles, which intersect the given circles orthogonally.

== System of orthogonal circles ==
The method described in the previous section for the construction of a pencil of circles, which intersect two given circles orthogonally, can be extended to the construction of two orthogonally intersecting systems of circles:

Let $c_1,c_2$ be two apart lying circles (as in the previous section), $M_1,M_2,r_1,r_2$ their centers and radii respectively, and let $g_{12}$ be their radical axis. Now, all the circles which have with $c_1$ the line $g_{12}$ as a radical axis will be determined with their centers on the line $\overline{M_1M_2}$. If $\gamma_2$ is such a circle, whose center has distance $\delta$ to the center $M_1$ and radius $\rho_2$. From the result in the previous section one gets the equation

$d_1=\frac{\delta^2+r_1^2-\rho_2^2}{2\delta} ,\quad$where $d_1>r_1$ are fixed.

With $\delta_2=\delta-d_1$ the equation can be rewritten as:

$$\delta_2^2=d_1^2-r_1^2+\rho_2^2$$.

System of orthogonal circles: construction

If the radius $\rho_2$ is given, from this equation one finds the distance $\delta_2$ to the (fixed) radical axis of the new center. On the diagram, the color of the new circles is purple. Any green circle has its center on the radical axis and intersects the circles $c_1,c_2$ orthogonally and hence all the new circles (the purple ones) too. Choosing the radical axis (the red line) as $y$-axis and line $\overline{M_1M_2}$ as $x$-axis, the two pencils of circles have the equations:

purple: $\ \ \ (x-\delta_2)^2+y^2=\delta_2^2+r_1^2-d_1^2$
green: $\ x^2+(y-y_g)^2=y_g^2+d_1^2-r_1^2\ .$

(the point$\; (0,y_g)$ is the center of a green circle.)

Properties:
a) Any two green circles intersect on the $x$-axis at the points $P_{1/2}=\big(\pm\sqrt{d_1^2-r_1^2},0\big)$, the poles of the orthogonal system of circles. That means, the $x$-axis is the radical axis of the green circles.
b) The purple circles have no points in common. But, if one considers the real plane as part of the complex plane, then any two purple circles intersect on the $y$-axis (their common radical axis) at the points $Q_{1/2}=\big(0,\pm i \sqrt{d_1^2-r_1^2}\big)$.

Parabolic orthogonal system

Coaxal circles: types

Special cases:
a) In case of $d_1=r_1$ the green circles are touching each other at the origin with the $x$-axis as common tangent and the purple circles have the $y$-axis as common tangent. Such a system of circles is called coaxal parabolic circles (see below).
b) Shrinking $c_1$ to its center $M_1$, i.e. $r_1=0$, the equations turn take a simpler form and one gets $M_1=P_1$.

Conclusion:
a) For any real $w$ the pencil of circles

$$\;c(\xi):\; (x-\xi)^2+y^2-\xi^2-w=0\ :$$
has the property: The $y$-axis is the radical axis of $c(\xi_1),c(\xi_2)$.
In case of $w>0$ the circles $c(\xi_1),c(\xi_2)$ intersect at points $P_{1/2}=(0,\pm\sqrt w)$.
In case of $w<0$ they have no points in common.
In case of $w=0$ they touch at $(0,0)$ and the $y$-axis is their common tangent.

b) For any real $w$ the two pencils of circles

$$c_1(\xi):\; (x-\xi)^2+y^2-\xi^2-w=0\ ,$$
$$c_2(\eta):\; x^2+(y-\eta)^2-\eta^2 + w=0 \$$
form a system of orthogonal circles. That means: any two circles $c_1(\xi),c_2(\eta)$ intersect orthogonally.

c) From the equations in b), one gets a coordinate free representation:

Orthogonal system of circles to given poles $P_1,P_2$

For the given points $P_1,P_2$, their midpoint $O$ and their line segment bisector $g_{12}$ the two equations

$$|XM|^2=|OM|^2-|OP_1|^2\ ,$$
$|XN|^2=|ON|^2+|OP_1|^2=|NP_1|^2$with $M$ on $\overline{P_1P_2}$, but not between $P_1,P_2$, and $N$ on $g_{12}$

describe the orthogonal system of circles uniquely determined by $P_1,P_2$ which are the poles of the system.
For $P_1=P_2=O$ one has to prescribe the axes $a_1,a_2$ of the system. The system is parabolic:

$|XM|^2=|OM|^2\ , \quad |XN|^2=|ON|^2$ with $M$ on $a_1$ and $N$ on $a_2$.

Straightedge and compass construction:

Orthogonal system of circles: straightedge and compass construction

A system of orthogonal circles is determined uniquely by its poles $P_1,P_2$:

1. The axes (radical axes) are the lines $\overline{P_1P_2}$ and the line segment bisector $g_{12}$ of the poles.
2. The circles (green in the diagram) through $P_1,P_2$ have their centers on $g_{12}$. They can be drawn easily. For a point $N$ the radius is $\;r_N=|NP_1|\;$.
3. In order to draw a circle of the second pencil (in diagram blue) with center $M$ on $\overline{P_1P_2}$, one has to determine the radius $r_M$ applying the theorem of Pythagoras: $\; r_M^2=|OM|^2-|OP_1|^2\;$ (see diagram).

In case of $P_1=P_2$ the axes have to be chosen additionally. The system is parabolic and can be drawn easily.

== Coaxal circles ==
Definition and properties:

Let $c_1,c_2$ be two circles and $\Pi_1,\Pi_2$ their power functions. Then for any $\lambda\ne 1$

- $\Pi_1(x,y)-\lambda\Pi_2(x,y)=0$

is the equation of a circle $c(\lambda)$ (see below). Such a class of circles is called the system of coaxal circles generated by the circles $c_1,c_2$. (In the case $\lambda=1$ the equation describes the radical axis of $c_1,c_2$.)

The power function of $c(\lambda)$ is

$$\ \Pi(\lambda,x,y)=\frac{\Pi_1(x,y)-\lambda\Pi_2(x,y)}{1-\lambda}$$.

The normed equation (the coefficients of $x^2,y^2$ are $1$) of $c(\lambda)$ is $\ \Pi(\lambda,x,y)=0$.

A simple calculation shows:

- $c(\lambda),c(\mu),\ \lambda\ne\mu\ ,$ have the same radical axis as $c_1$ and $c_2.$

Allowing $\lambda$ to move to infinity, one can see that $c_1$ and $c_2$ are members of the system of coaxal circles: $c_1=c(0),\; c_2=c(\infty)$.

(E): If $c_1,c_2$ intersect at two points $P_1,P_2$, then $P_1,P_2$ are points of any circle $c(\lambda)$, and the line $\overline{P_1P_2}$ is their common radical axis. Such a system is called elliptic.
(P): If $c_1$ and $c_2$ are tangent at $P$, then any circle of the system is tangent to both $c_1$ and $c_2$ at point $P$. The common tangent is their common radical axis. Such a system is called parabolic.
(H): If $c_1$ and $c_2$ have no point in common, then the same is true for any pair of circles of the system. The radical axis of any pair of circles is the radical axis of $c_1$ and $c_2$. This system is called hyperbolic.

In detail:

Introducing coordinates such that

$$c_1: (x-d_1)^2+y^2=r_1^2$$
$$c_2: (x-d_2)^2+y^2= d_2^2+r_1^2-d_1^2$$,

then the $y$-axis is their radical axis (see above).

Calculating the power function $\Pi(\lambda,x,y)$ gives the normed circle equation:

$$c(\lambda): \ x^2+y^2-2\tfrac{d_1-\lambda d_2}{1-\lambda}\; x +d_1^2-r_1^2=0\ .$$

Completing the square and substituting $\delta_2=\tfrac{d_1-\lambda d_2}{1-\lambda}$ ($x$-coordinate of the center) yields the centered form of the equation

$$c(\lambda): \ (x-\delta_2)^2+y^2=\delta_2^2+r_1^2-d_1^2$$.

When $r_1>d_1$ the circles $c_1,c_2,c(\lambda)$ intersect at the two points

$$P_1=\big(0,\sqrt{r_1^2-d_1^2}\big),\quad P_2=\big(0,-\sqrt{r_1^2-d_1^2}\big)$$

and the system of coaxal circles is elliptic.

If $r_1=d_1$, the circles $c_1,c_2,c(\lambda)$ have the point $P_0=(0,0)$ in common and the system is parabolic.

If $r_1<d_1,$ the circles $c_1,c_2,c(\lambda)$ have no point in common and the system is hyperbolic.

Alternative equations:
1) In the defining equation of a coaxal system of circles there can be used multiples of the power functions, too.
2) The equation of one of the circles can be replaced by the equation of the desired radical axis. The radical axis can be seen as a circle with an infinitely large radius. For example:

$$(x-x_1)^2+y^2-r^2_1\  - \ \lambda\; 2(x-x_2)\ =0\ \Leftrightarrow$$
$$(x-(x_1+\lambda))^2+y^2 =(x_1+\lambda)^2+r_1^2-x_1^2-2\lambda x_2$$,

describes all circles, which have with the first circle the line $x=x_2$ as radical axis.
3) In order to express the equal status of the two circles, the following form is often used:

$$\mu\Pi_1(x,y)+\nu\Pi_2(x,y)=0\; .$$

But in this case the representation of a circle by the parameters $\mu,\nu$ is not unique.

Applications:
a) Circle inversions and Möbius transformations preserve angles and generalized circles. Hence orthogonal systems of circles play an essential role with investigations on these mappings.
b) In electromagnetism coaxal circles appear as field lines.

== Radical center of three circles, construction of the radical axis ==
Radical center of three circles The green circle intersects the three circles orthogonally.

For three circles $c_1,c_2,c_3$, no two of which are concentric, there are three radical axes $g_{12},g_{23},g_{31}.$ If the centers of these circles are not collinear, their radical axes intersect in a common point $R$, the radical center of the three circles. The circle which is orthogonal to the two circles with center in $R$ is orthogonal to the third circle (radical circle).

Proof. The radical axis $g_{ik}$ contains all points which have equal tangential distance to the circles $c_i,c_k$. The intersection point $R$ of $g_{12}$ and $g_{23}$ has the same tangential distance to the all three circles. Hence, $R$ is a point on the radical axis $g_{31}$, too.
This property allows one to construct the radical axis of two non intersecting circles $c_1,c_2$ with centers $M_1,M_2$: Draw a third circle $c_3$ with center not collinear to the given centers that intersects $c_1,c_2$. The radical axes $g_{13},g_{23}$ can be drawn. Their intersection point is the radical center $R$ of the three circles and lies on $g_{12}$. The line through $R$ which is perpendicular to $\overline{M_1M_2}$ is the radical axis $g_{12}$.

Additional construction method:

Construction of the radical axis with circles $c'_1,c'_2$ of equal power. It holds $\Pi_1(P_1)=\Pi_2(P_2)$.

All points which have the same power to a given circle $c$ lie on a circle concentric to $c$. Let us call it an equipower circle. This property can be used for an additional construction method of the radical axis of two circles:

For two non intersecting circles $c_1,c_2$, there can be drawn two equipower circles $c'_1,c'_2$, which have the same power with respect to $c_1,c_2$ (see diagram). In detail: $\Pi_1(P_1)=\Pi_2(P_2)$. If the power is large enough, the circles $c'_1,c'_2$ have two points in common, which lie on the radical axis $g_{12}$.

== Relation to bipolar coordinates ==
In general, any two disjoint, non-concentric circles can be aligned with the circles of a system of bipolar coordinates. In that case, the radical axis is simply the $y$-axis of this system of coordinates. Every circle on the axis that passes through the two foci of the coordinate system intersects the two circles orthogonally. A maximal collection of circles, all having centers on a given line and all pairs having the same radical axis, is known as a pencil of coaxal circles.

== Radical center in trilinear coordinates ==
If the circles are represented in trilinear coordinates in the usual way, then their radical center is conveniently given as a certain determinant. Specifically, let $X=x:y:z$ denote a variable point in the plane of a triangle $ABC$ which has sides with lengths $a = |BC|, b = |CA|, c = |AB|,$ and represent the circles as follows:

$$(dx+ ey + fz)(ax + by + cz) + g(ayz + bzx + cxy) = 0,$$

$$(hx + iy + jz)(ax + by + cz) + k(ayz + bzx + cxy) = 0,$$

$$(lx + my + nz)(ax + by + cz) + p(ayz + bzx + cxy) = 0.$$

Then the radical center is the point

$$\begin{vmatrix}
g&k&p\\
e&i&m\\
f&j&n
\end{vmatrix}:
\begin{vmatrix}
g&k&p\\
f&j&n\\
d&h&l
\end{vmatrix} :
\begin{vmatrix}
g&k&p \\
d&h&l\\e&i&m\end{vmatrix}.$$

== Radical plane and hyperplane ==
The radical plane of two non-concentric spheres in three dimensions is defined similarly: it is the locus of points from which tangents to the two spheres have same lengths. The fact that this locus is a plane follows by rotation in the third dimension from the fact that the radical axis is a straight line.

The same definition can be applied to hyperspheres in Euclidean space of any dimension, giving the radical hyperplane of two non-concentric hyperspheres.
