= List of solids derived from the sphere =

This page lists solids derived from a sphere.

== Solids from cutting a sphere with one or more planes ==
- Dome
- Spherical cap
- Spherical sector
- Spherical segment
- Spherical shell
- Spherical wedge

== Solids from deforming a sphere ==
- Ellipsoid
- Spheroid
- Solid bounded by Morin surface
- Any Genus 0 surface

== Solids from intersecting a sphere with other solids or curved planes ==
- Reuleaux tetrahedron
- Spherical lens
