= Two-ball =

Two-ball, twoball, 2-ball, or 2 ball may refer to:

- 2 ball, the pool ball (pocket billiards) numbered "2" and colored blue
- 2 ball, the yellow snooker ball, worth two points, normally referred to as "the yellow"
- 2-ball, a two-dimensional n-ball in mathematics, represented by the disk of a circle.

== See also ==
- Ball two, the second non-strike thrown to a batter in baseball or softball
