= Circular sector =

Portion of a disk enclosed by two radii and an arc

The minor sector is shaded in green while the major sector is shaded white.

A circular sector, also known as circle sector or disk sector or simply a sector (symbol: ⌔), is the portion of a disk (a closed region bounded by a circle) enclosed by two radii and an arc, with the smaller area being known as the minor sector and the larger being the major sector. In the diagram, θ is the central angle, r the radius of the circle, and L is the arc length of the minor sector.

== Types ==
A sector with the central angle of 180° is called a half-disk and is bounded by a diameter and a semicircle. Sectors with other central angles are sometimes given special names, such as quadrants (90°), sextants (60°), and octants (45°), which come from the sector being one quarter, sixth or eighth part of a full circle, respectively.

== Area ==
The total area of a circle is πr^{2}. The area of a sector in terms of L can be obtained by multiplying the total area πr^{2} by the ratio of L to the total perimeter 2πr.
$$A = \pi r^2\, \frac{L}{2\pi r} = \frac{rL}{2}$$
The area of the sector can be obtained by multiplying the circle's area by the ratio of the angle θ (expressed in radians) and 2π (because the area of the sector is directly proportional to its angle, and 2π is the angle for the whole circle, in radians):
$$A = \pi r^2\, \frac{\theta}{2 \pi} = \frac{r^2 \theta}{2}$$
Another approach is to consider this area as the result of the following integral:
$$A = \int_0^\theta\int_0^r dA = \int_0^\theta\int_0^r \tilde{r}\, d\tilde{r}\, d\tilde{\theta} = \int_0^\theta \frac 1 2 r^2\, d\tilde{\theta} = \frac{r^2 \theta}{2}$$

Converting the central angle into degrees gives
$$A = \pi r^2 \frac{\theta^\circ}{360^\circ}$$

== Arc length ==
The formula for the length of an arc is:
$$L = r \theta$$
where L represents the arc length, r represents the radius of the circle and θ represents the angle in radians made by the arc at the centre of the circle.

If the value of angle is given in degrees, then we can also use the following formula by:
$$L = 2 \pi r \frac{\theta}{360^\circ}$$

== Perimeter ==
The length of the perimeter of a sector is the sum of the arc length and the two radii:
$$P = L + 2r = \theta r + 2r = r (\theta + 2)$$
where θ is in radians.

== Chord length ==
The length of a chord formed with the extremal points of the arc is given by
$$C = 2r\sin\frac{\theta}{2}$$
where C represents the chord length, r represents the radius of the circle, and θ represents the angular width of the sector in radians.

== See also ==
- Circular segment – the part of the sector which remains after removing the triangle formed by the center of the circle and the two endpoints of the circular arc on the boundary.
- Circle-circle intersection
- Conic section
- Earth quadrant
- Hyperbolic sector
- Sector of (mathematics)
- Spherical sector – the analogous 3D figure
- Spherical wedge – another 3D generalization

== Sources ==
- Gerard, L. J. V. (1874). The Elements of Geometry, in Eight Books; or, First Step in Applied Logic. London: Longmans, Green, Reader and Dyer. p. 285.
- Legendre, Adrien-Marie (1858). Davies, Charles (ed.). Elements of Geometry and Trigonometry. New York: A. S. Barnes & Co. p. 119.
