= Spherical cap =

Section of a sphere

An example of a spherical cap in blue (and another in red)

In geometry, a spherical cap or spherical dome is a portion of a sphere or of a ball cut off by a plane. It is also a spherical segment of one base, i.e., bounded by a single plane. If the plane passes through the center of the sphere (forming a great circle), so that the height of the cap is equal to the radius of the sphere, the spherical cap is called a hemisphere.

== Volume and surface area ==
The volume of the spherical cap and the area of the curved surface may be calculated using combinations of

- The radius $r$ of the sphere
- The radius $a$ of the base of the cap
- The height $h$ of the cap
- The polar angle $\theta$ between the rays from the center of the sphere to the apex of the cap (the pole) and the edge of the disk forming the base of the cap.

These variables are inter-related through the formulas $a = r \sin \theta$, $h = r ( 1 - \cos \theta )$, $2hr = a^2 + h^2$, and $2 h a = (a^2 + h^2)\sin \theta$.

	Using $r$ and $h$	Using $a$ and $h$	Using $r$ and $\theta$
Volume	$V = \frac {\pi h^2}{3} (3r-h)$	$V = \frac{1}{6}\pi h (3a^2 + h^2)$	$V = \frac{\pi}{3} r^3 (2+\cos\theta) (1-\cos\theta)^2$
Area	$A = 2 \pi r h$	$A =\pi (a^2 + h^2)$	$A=2 \pi r^2 (1-\cos \theta)$
Constraints	$0 \leq h \leq 2 r$	$0 \leq a, \; 0 \leq h$	$0 \leq \theta \leq \pi, \; 0 \leq r$

If $\phi$ denotes the latitude in geographic coordinates, then $\theta+\phi = \pi/2 = 90^\circ\,$, and $\cos \theta = \sin \phi$.

=== Deriving the surface area intuitively from the spherical sector volume ===
Note that aside from the calculus based argument below, the area of the spherical cap may be derived from the volume $V_{sec}$ of the spherical sector, by an intuitive argument, as

$$A = \frac{3}{r}V_{sec} = \frac{3}{r} \frac{2\pi r^2h}{3} = 2\pi rh\,.$$

The intuitive argument is based upon summing the total sector volume from that of infinitesimal triangular pyramids. Utilizing the pyramid (or cone) volume formula of $V = \frac{1}{3} bh'$, where $b$ is the infinitesimal area of each pyramidal base (located on the surface of the sphere) and $h'$ is the height of each pyramid from its base to its apex (at the center of the sphere). Since each $h'$, in the limit, is constant and equivalent to the radius $r$ of the sphere, the sum of the infinitesimal pyramidal bases would equal the area of the spherical sector, and:

$$V_{sec} = \sum{V} = \sum\frac{1}{3} bh' = \sum\frac{1}{3} br = \frac{r}{3} \sum b = \frac{r}{3} A$$

=== Deriving the volume and surface area using calculus ===
Rotating the green area creates a spherical cap with height $h$ and sphere radius $r$.

The volume and area formulas may be derived by examining the rotation of the function

$$f(x)=\sqrt{r^2-(x-r)^2}=\sqrt{2rx-x^2}$$

for $x \in [0,h]$, using the formulas the surface of the rotation for the area and the solid of the revolution for the volume. The area is

$$A = 2\pi\int_0^h f(x) \sqrt{1+f'(x)^2} \,dx$$

The derivative of $f$ is

$$f'(x) = \frac{r-x}{\sqrt{2rx-x^2}}$$

and hence

$$1+f'(x)^2 = \frac{r^2}{2rx-x^2}$$

The formula for the area is therefore

$$A = 2\pi\int_0^h \sqrt{2rx-x^2} \sqrt{\frac{r^2}{2rx-x^2}} \,dx
= 2\pi \int_0^h r\,dx
= 2\pi r \left[x\right]_0^h
= 2 \pi r h$$

The volume is

$$V = \pi \int_0^h f(x)^2 \,dx
= \pi \int_0^h (2rx-x^2) \,dx
= \pi \left[rx^2-\frac13x^3\right]_0^h
= \frac{\pi h^2}{3} (3r - h)$$

== Moment of inertia ==
The moments of inertia of a spherical cap (where the z-axis is the symmetrical axis) about the principal axes (center) of the sphere are:

$$J_{zz,\text{cap}} = \frac{m h \left( 3 h^2 - 15 h R + 20 R^2 \right)}{10 \left( 3 R - h \right)}$$

$$J_{xx,\text{cap}} = J_{yy, \text{cap}} =\frac{m \left( -9 h^3 + 45 h^2 R - 80 h R^2 + 60 R^3 \right)}{20 \left( 3 R - h \right)}$$

where m and h are, respectively, the mass and height of the spherical cap and R is the radius of the entire sphere.

== Applications ==
=== Volumes of union and intersection of two intersecting spheres ===
The volume of the union of two intersecting spheres of radii $r_1$ and $r_2$ is

$$V = V^{(1)}-V^{(2)}\,,$$

where

$$V^{(1)} = \frac{4\pi}{3}r_1^3 +\frac{4\pi}{3}r_2^3$$

is the sum of the volumes of the two isolated spheres, and

$$V^{(2)} = \frac{\pi h_1^2}{3}(3r_1-h_1)+\frac{\pi h_2^2}{3}(3r_2-h_2)$$

the sum of the volumes of the two spherical caps forming their intersection. If $d \le r_1+r_2$ is the distance between the two sphere centers, elimination of the variables $h_1$ and $h_2$ leads to

$$V^{(2)} = \frac{\pi}{12d}(r_1+r_2-d)^2 \left( d^2+2d(r_1+r_2)-3(r_1-r_2)^2 \right)\,.$$

=== Volume of a spherical cap with a curved base ===
The volume of a spherical cap with a curved base can be calculated by considering two spheres with radii $r_1$ and $r_2$, separated by some distance $d$, and for which their surfaces intersect at $x=h$. That is, the curvature of the base comes from sphere 2. The volume is thus the difference between sphere 2's cap (with height $(r_2-r_1)-(d-h)$) and sphere 1's cap (with height $h$),

$$\begin{align}
V & = \frac{\pi h^2}{3}(3r_1-h) - \frac{\pi [(r_2-r_1)-(d-h)]^2}{3}[3r_2-((r_2-r_1)-(d-h))]\,, \\
V & = \frac{\pi h^2}{3}(3r_1-h) - \frac{\pi}{3}(d-h)^3\left(\frac{r_2-r_1}{d-h}-1\right)^2\left[\frac{2r_2+r_1}{d-h}+1\right]\,.
\end{align}$$

This formula is valid only for configurations that satisfy $0<d<r_2$ and $d-(r_2-r_1)<h\leq r_1$. If sphere 2 is very large such that $r_2\gg r_1$, hence $d \gg h$ and $r_2\approx d$, which is the case for a spherical cap with a base that has a negligible curvature, the above equation is equal to the volume of a spherical cap with a flat base, as expected.

=== Areas of intersecting spheres ===
Consider two intersecting spheres of radii $r_1$ and $r_2$, with their centers separated by distance $d$. They intersect if

$$|r_1-r_2|\leq d \leq r_1+r_2$$

From the law of cosines, the polar angle of the spherical cap on the sphere of radius $r_1$ is

$$\cos \theta = \frac{r_1^2-r_2^2+d^2}{2r_1d}$$

Using this, the surface area of the spherical cap on the sphere of radius $r_1$ is

$$A_1 = 2\pi r_1^2 \left( 1+\frac{r_2^2-r_1^2-d^2}{2 r_1 d} \right)$$

=== Surface area bounded by parallel disks ===
The curved surface area of the spherical segment bounded by two parallel disks is the difference of surface areas of their respective spherical caps. For a sphere of radius $r$, and caps with heights $h_1$ and $h_2$, the area is

$$A=2 \pi r |h_1 - h_2|\,,$$

or, using geographic coordinates with latitudes $\phi_1$ and $\phi_2$,

$$A=2 \pi r^2 |\sin \phi_1 - \sin \phi_2|\,,$$

For example, assuming the Earth is a sphere of radius 6371 km, the surface area of the arctic (north of the Arctic Circle, at latitude 66.56° as of August 2016) is 2π ⋅ 6371^{2} |sin 90° − sin 66.56°| = 21.04 million km^{2} (8.12 million mi^{2}), or 0.5 ⋅ |sin 90° − sin 66.56°| = 4.125% of the total surface area of the Earth.

This formula can also be used to demonstrate that half the surface area of the Earth lies between latitudes 30° South and 30° North in a spherical zone which encompasses all of the tropics.

== Generalizations ==
=== Sections of other solids ===
The spheroidal dome is obtained by sectioning off a portion of a spheroid so that the resulting dome is circularly symmetric (having an axis of rotation), and likewise the ellipsoidal dome is derived from the ellipsoid.

=== Hyperspherical cap ===
Generally, the $n$-dimensional volume of a hyperspherical cap of height $h$ and radius $r$ in $n$-dimensional Euclidean space is given by:
$$V = \frac{\pi ^ {\frac{n-1}{2}}\, r^{n}}{\,\Gamma \left ( \frac{n+1}{2} \right )} \int_{0}^{\arccos\left(\frac{r-h}{r}\right)}\sin^n (\theta) \,\mathrm{d}\theta$$
where $\Gamma$ (the gamma function) is given by $\Gamma(z) = \int_0^\infty t^{z-1} \mathrm{e}^{-t}\,\mathrm{d}t$.

The formula for $V$ can be expressed in terms of the volume of the unit n-ball $C_n = \pi^{n/2} / \Gamma[1+\frac{n}{2}]$ and the hypergeometric function ${}_{2}F_{1}$ or the regularized incomplete beta function $I_x(a,b)$ as
$$V = C_{n} \, r^{n} \left( \frac{1}{2}\, - \,\frac{r-h}{r} \,\frac{\Gamma[1+\frac{n}{2}]}{\sqrt{\pi}\,\Gamma[\frac{n+1}{2}]}
{\,\,}_{2}F_{1}\left(\tfrac{1}{2},\tfrac{1-n}{2};\tfrac{3}{2};\left(\tfrac{r-h}{r}\right)^{2}\right)\right)
= \frac{1}{2}C_{n} \, r^n I_{(2rh-h^2)/r^2} \left(\frac{n+1}{2}, \frac{1}{2} \right),$$

and the area formula $A$ can be expressed in terms of the area of the unit n-ball $A_{n}={2\pi^{n/2}/\Gamma[\frac{n}{2}]}$ as
$$A =\frac{1}{2}A_{n} \, r^{n-1} I_{(2rh-h^2)/r^2} \left(\frac{n-1}{2}, \frac{1}{2} \right),$$
where $0\le h\le r$.

A. Chudnov derived the following formulas:
$$A = A_n r^{n-1} p_ { n-2 } (q),\, V = C_n r^{n} p_n (q) ,$$
where
$$q = 1-h/r (0 \le q \le 1 ), p_n (q) =(1-G_n(q)/G_n(1))/2 ,$$
$$G _n(q)= \int _0^q (1-t^2) ^ { (n-1) /2 } dt .$$

For odd $n=2k+1$:
$$G_n(q) = \sum_{i=0}^k (-1) ^i \binom k i \frac {q^{2i+1}} {2i+1} .$$

==== Asymptotics ====
If $n \to \infty$ and $q\sqrt n = \text{const.}$, then $p_n (q) \to 1- F({q \sqrt n})$ where $F$ is the integral of the standard normal distribution.

A more quantitative bound is $A/(A_n r^{n-1}) = n^{\Theta(1)} \cdot [(2-h/r)h/r]^{n/2}$. For large caps (that is when $(1-h/r)^4\cdot n = O(1)$ as $n\to \infty$), the bound simplifies to $n^{\Theta(1)} \cdot e^{-(1-h/r)^2n/2}$.

== See also ==
- Circular segment — the analogous 2D object
- Solid angle — contains formula for n-sphere caps
- Spherical segment
- Spherical sector
- Spherical wedge
