= Ungula =

Region between a revolved surface and oblique plane

In solid geometry, an ungula is a region of a solid of revolution, cut off by a plane oblique to its base. A common instance is the spherical wedge. The term ungula refers to the hoof of a horse, an anatomical feature that defines a class of mammals called ungulates.

The volume of an ungula of a cylinder was calculated by Grégoire de Saint Vincent. Two cylinders with equal radii and perpendicular axes intersect in four double ungulae. The bicylinder formed by the intersection had been measured by Archimedes in The Method of Mechanical Theorems, but the manuscript was lost until 1906.

A historian of calculus described the role of the ungula in integral calculus:

Grégoire himself was primarily concerned to illustrate by reference to the ungula that volumetric integration could be reduced, through the ductus in planum, to a consideration of geometric relations between the lies of plane figures. The ungula, however, proved a valuable source of inspiration for those who followed him, and who saw in it a means of representing and transforming integrals in many ingenious ways.

== Cylindrical ungula ==
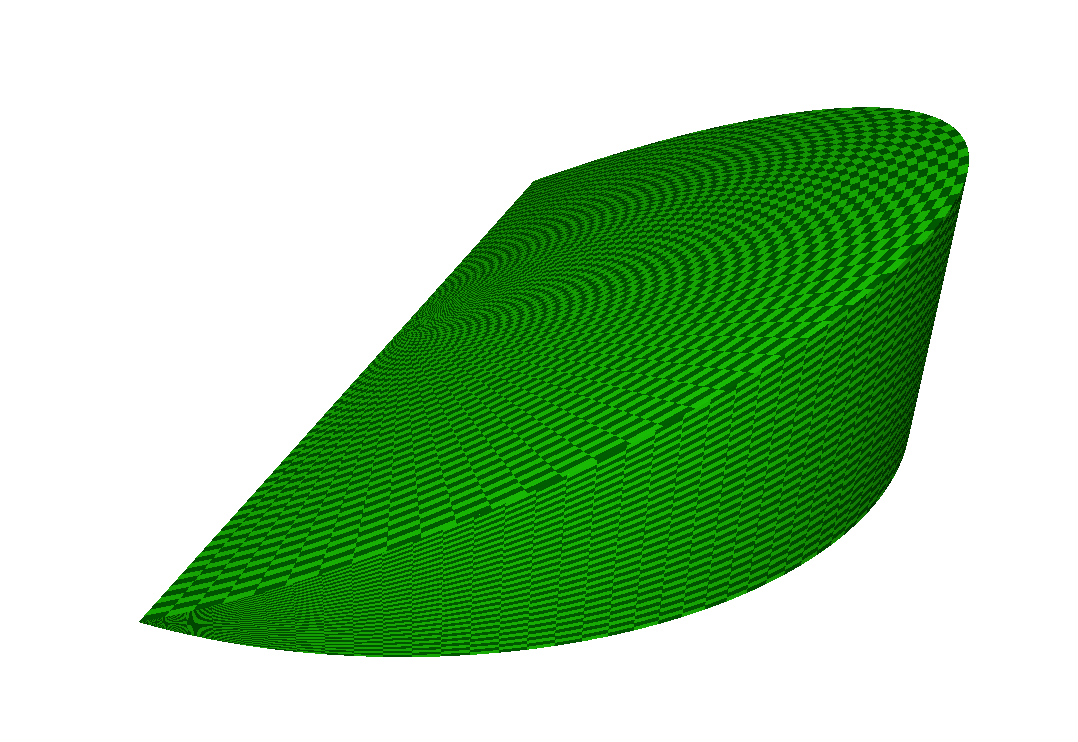
Ungula of a right circular cylinder.

A cylindrical ungula of base radius r and height h has volume

$V = {2\over 3} r^2 h$,.

Its total surface area is

$$A = {1\over 2} \pi r^2 + {1\over 2} \pi r \sqrt{r^2 + h^2} + 2 r h$$,

the surface area of its curved sidewall is

$$A_s = 2 r h$$,

and the surface area of its top (slanted roof) is

$$A_t = {1\over 2} \pi r \sqrt{r^2 + h^2}$$.

=== Proof ===
Consider a cylinder $x^2 + y^2 = r^2$ bounded below by plane $z = 0$ and above by plane $z = k y$ where k is the slope of the slanted roof:

$$k = {h \over r}$$.

Cutting up the volume into slices parallel to the y-axis, then a differential slice, shaped like a triangular prism, has volume

$$A(x) \, dx$$

where

$$A(x) = {1\over 2} \sqrt{r^2 - x^2} \cdot k \sqrt{r^2 - x^2} = {1\over 2} k (r^2 - x^2)$$

is the area of a right triangle whose vertices are, $(x, 0, 0)$, $(x, \sqrt{r^2 - x^2}, 0)$, and $(x, \sqrt{r^2 - x^2}, k \sqrt{r^2 - x^2})$, and whose base and height are thereby $\sqrt{r^2 - x^2}$ and $k \sqrt{r^2 - x^2}$, respectively. Then the volume of the whole cylindrical ungula is

$$V = \int_{-r}^r A(x) \, dx = \int_{-r}^r {1\over 2} k (r^2 - x^2) \, dx$$
$$\qquad = {1\over 2} k \Big([r^2 x]_{-r}^r - \Big[{1\over 3} x^3\Big]_{-r}^r \Big) = {1\over 2} k (2 r^3 - {2\over 3} r^3) = {2 \over 3} k r^3$$

which equals

$$V = {2\over 3} r^2 h$$

after substituting $r k = h$.

A differential surface area of the curved side wall is

$$dA_s = k r (\sin \theta) \cdot r \, d\theta = k r^2 (\sin \theta)  \, d\theta$$,

which area belongs to a nearly flat rectangle bounded by vertices $(r \cos \theta, r \sin \theta, 0)$, $(r \cos \theta, r \sin \theta, k r \sin \theta)$, $(r \cos (\theta + d\theta), r \sin (\theta + d\theta), 0)$, and $(r \cos (\theta + d\theta), r \sin (\theta + d\theta), k r \sin (\theta + d\theta))$, and whose width and height are thereby $r \, d\theta$ and (close enough to) $k r \sin \theta$, respectively. Then the surface area of the wall is

$$A_s = \int_0^\pi dA_s = \int_0^\pi k r^2 (\sin \theta) \, d\theta = k r^2 \int_0^\pi \sin \theta \, d\theta$$

where the integral yields $-[\cos \theta]_0^\pi = -[-1 - 1] = 2$, so that the area of the wall is

$$A_s = 2 k r^2$$,

and substituting $r k = h$ yields

$$A_s = 2 r h$$.

The base of the cylindrical ungula has the surface area of half a circle of radius r: ${1\over 2} \pi r^2$, and the slanted top of the said ungula is a half-ellipse with semi-minor axis of length r and semi-major axis of length $r \sqrt{1 + k^2}$, so that its area is

$$A_t = {1\over 2} \pi r \cdot r \sqrt{1 + k^2} = {1\over 2} \pi r \sqrt{r^2 + (k r)^2}$$

and substituting $k r = h$ yields

$A_t = {1\over 2} \pi r \sqrt{r^2 + h^2}$. ∎

Note how the surface area of the side wall is related to the volume: such surface area being $2kr^2$, multiplying it by $dr$ gives the volume of a differential half-shell, whose integral is ${2\over 3} k r^3$, the volume.

When the slope k equals 1 then such ungula is precisely one eighth of a bicylinder, whose volume is ${16\over 3} r^3$. One eighth of this is ${2\over 3} r^3$.

== Conical ungula ==
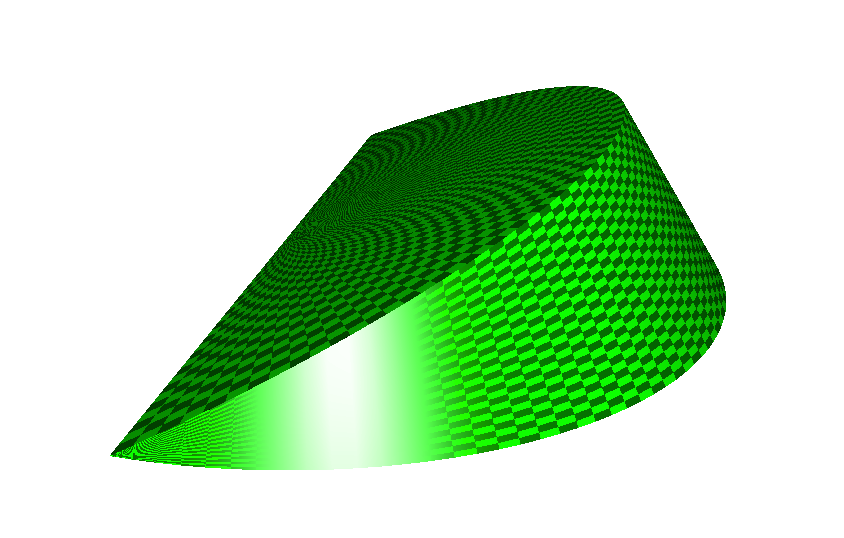
Ungula of a right circular cone.

A conical ungula of height h, base radius r, and upper flat surface slope k (if the semicircular base is at the bottom, on the plane z = 0) has volume

$$V = {r^3 k H I \over 6}$$

where

$$H = {1 \over {1\over h} - {1\over r k}}$$

is the height of the cone from which the ungula has been cut out, and

$$I = \int_0^\pi {2 H + k r \sin \theta \over (H + k r \sin \theta)^2} \sin \theta \, d\theta$$.

The surface area of the curved sidewall is

$$A_s = {k r^2 \sqrt{r^2 + H^2} \over 2} I$$.

As a consistency check, consider what happens when the height of the cone goes to infinity, so that the cone becomes a cylinder in the limit:

$$\lim_{H\rightarrow \infty} \Big(I - {4\over H}\Big) = \lim_{H\rightarrow \infty} \Big({2 H \over H^2} \int_0^\pi \sin \theta \, d\theta - {4\over H} \Big) = 0$$

so that

$$\lim_{H\rightarrow \infty} V = {r^3 k H \over 6} \cdot {4\over H} = {2\over 3} k r^3$$,

$\lim_{H\rightarrow \infty} A_s = {k r^2 H \over 2} \cdot {4\over H} = 2 k r^2$, and

$$\lim_{H\rightarrow \infty} A_t = {1\over 2} \pi r^2 {\sqrt{1 + k^2} \over 1 + 0} = {1\over 2} \pi r^2 \sqrt{1 + k^2} = {1\over 2} \pi r \sqrt{r^2 + (r k)^2}$$,

which results agree with the cylindrical case.

=== Proof ===
Let a cone be described by

$$1 - {\rho \over r} = {z \over H}$$

where r and H are constants and z and ρ are variables, with

$$\rho = \sqrt{x^2 + y^2}, \qquad 0 \le \rho \le r$$

and

$$x = \rho \cos \theta, \qquad y = \rho \sin \theta$$.

Let the cone be cut by a plane

$$z = k y = k \rho \sin \theta$$.

Substituting this z into the cone's equation, and solving for ρ yields

$$\rho_0 = {1 \over {1\over r} + {k \sin \theta \over H}}$$

which for a given value of θ is the radial coordinate of the point common to both the plane and the cone that is farthest from the cone's axis along an angle θ from the x-axis. The cylindrical height coordinate of this point is

$$z_0 = H \Big(1 - {\rho_0 \over r}\Big)$$.

So along the direction of angle θ, a cross-section of the conical ungula looks like the triangle

$$(0,0,0) - (\rho_0 \cos \theta, \rho_0 \sin \theta, z_0) - (r \cos \theta, r \sin \theta, 0)$$.

Rotating this triangle by an angle $d\theta$ about the z-axis yields another triangle with $\theta + d\theta$, $\rho_1$, $z_1$ substituted for $\theta$, $\rho_0$, and $z_0$ respectively, where $\rho_1$ and $z_1$ are functions of $\theta + d\theta$ instead of $\theta$. Since $d\theta$ is infinitesimal then $\rho_1$ and $z_1$ also vary infinitesimally from $\rho_0$ and $z_0$, so for purposes of considering the volume of the differential trapezoidal pyramid, they may be considered equal.

The differential trapezoidal pyramid has a trapezoidal base with a length at the base (of the cone) of $r d\theta$, a length at the top of $\Big({H - z_0 \over H}\Big) r d\theta$, and altitude ${z_0 \over H} \sqrt{r^2 + H^2}$, so the trapezoid has area

$$A_T = {r\,d\theta + \Big({H - z_0 \over H}\Big) r\,d\theta \over 2} {z_0 \over H} \sqrt{r^2 + H^2} = r\,d\theta {(2 H - z_0) z_0 \over 2 H^2} \sqrt{r^2 + H^2}$$.

An altitude from the trapezoidal base to the point $(0,0,0)$ has length differentially close to

$${r H \over \sqrt{r^2 + H^2}}$$.

(This is an altitude of one of the side triangles of the trapezoidal pyramid.) The volume of the pyramid is one-third its base area times its altitudinal length, so the volume of the conical ungula is the integral of that:

$$V = \int_0^\pi {1\over 3} {r H\over \sqrt{r^2 + H^2}} {(2 H - z_0) z_0 \over 2 H^2} \sqrt{r^2 + H^2} r\,d\theta = \int_0^\pi {1\over 3} r^2 {(2 H - z_0) z_0 \over 2 H} d\theta = {r^2 k \over 6 H} \int_0^\pi (2 H - k y_0) y_0 \,d\theta$$

where

$$y_0 = \rho_0 \sin \theta = {\sin \theta \over {1\over r} + {k \sin \theta \over H}} = {1 \over {1\over r \sin \theta} + {k\over H}}$$

Substituting the right hand side into the integral and doing some algebraic manipulation yields the formula for volume to be proven.

For the sidewall:

$$A_s = \int_0^\pi A_T = \int_0^\pi {(2 H - z_0) z_0 \over 2 H^2} r \sqrt{r^2 + H^2}\,d\theta = {k r \sqrt{r^2 + H^2} \over 2 H^2} \int_0^\pi (2 H - z_0) y_0 \,d\theta$$

and the integral on the rightmost-hand-side simplifies to $H^2 r I$. ∎

As a consistency check, consider what happens when k goes to infinity; then the conical ungula should become a semi-cone.

$$\lim_{k\rightarrow \infty} \Big(I - {\pi \over k r}\Big) = 0$$

$$\lim_{k\rightarrow \infty} V = {r^3 k H \over 6} \cdot {\pi \over k r} = {1\over 2} \Big({1\over 3} \pi r^2 H\Big)$$

which is half of the volume of a cone.

$$\lim_{k\rightarrow \infty} A_s = {k r^2 \sqrt{r^2 + H^2} \over 2} \cdot {\pi \over k r} = {1\over 2} \pi r \sqrt{r^2 + H^2}$$

which is half of the surface area of the curved wall of a cone.

=== Surface area of top part ===
When $k = H / r$, the "top part" (i.e., the flat face that is not semicircular like the base) has a parabolic shape and its surface area is

$$A_t = {2\over 3} r \sqrt{r^2 + H^2}$$.

When $k < H / r$ then the top part has an elliptic shape (i.e., it is less than one-half of an ellipse) and its surface area is

$$A_t = {1\over 2} \pi x_{max} (y_1 - y_m) \sqrt{1 + k^2} \Lambda$$

where

$$x_{max} = \sqrt{{k^2 r^4 H^2 - k^4 r^6 \over (k^2 r^2 - H^2)^2} + r^2}$$,

$$y_1 = {1 \over {1 \over r} + {k \over H}}$$,

$$y_m = {k r^2 H \over k^2 r^2 - H^2}$$,

$\Lambda = {\pi \over 4} - {1\over 2} \arcsin (1 - \lambda) - {1\over 4} \sin (2 \arcsin (1 - \lambda))$, and

$$\lambda = {y_1 \over y_1 - y_m}$$.

When $k > H / r$ then the top part is a section of a hyperbola and its surface area is

$$A_t = \sqrt{1 + k^2} (2 C r - a J)$$

where

$$C = {y_1 + y_2 \over 2} = y_m$$,

$y_1$ is as above,

$$y_2 = {1 \over {k\over H} - {1\over r}}$$,

$$a = {r \over \sqrt{C^2 - \Delta^2}}$$,

$$\Delta = {y_2 - y_1 \over 2}$$,

$$J = {r\over a} B + {\Delta^2 \over 2} \log \Biggr|{{r\over a} + B\over {-r \over a} + B}\Biggr|$$,

where the logarithm is natural, and

$$B = \sqrt{\Delta^2 + {r^2 \over a^2}}$$.

== See also ==
- Spherical wedge
- Steinmetz solid
