= Lawson topology =

In mathematics and theoretical computer science, the Lawson topology, named after Jimmie D. Lawson, is a topology on partially ordered sets (posets) used in the study of domain theory. The lower topology on a poset P is generated by the subbasis consisting of all complements of principal filters on P. The Lawson topology on P is the smallest common refinement of the lower topology and the Scott topology on P.

== Properties ==
- If P is a complete upper semilattice, the Lawson topology on P is always a complete T_{1} topology.

== See also ==
- Formal ball
