= Formal ball =

Mathematical ball with unbounded or negative radius

In topology, a branch of mathematics, a formal ball is an extension of the notion of ball to allow unbounded and negative radius. The concept of formal ball was introduced by Weihrauch and Schreiber in 1981 and the negative radius case (the generalized formal ball) by Tsuiki and Hattori in 2008.

Specifically, if $(X,d)$ is a metric space then an element of $B^+(X,d) = X\times\mathbb{R}^{+}$ is a formal ball, where $\mathbb{R}^{+}$ is the set of nonnegative real number. Elements of $B(X,d)=X\times\mathbb{R}$ are known as generalized formal balls.

Formal balls possess a partial order $\leq$ defined by $(x,r) \leq (y,s)$ if $d(x,y) \leq r-s$.

Generalized formal balls are interesting because this partial order works just as well for $B(X,d)$ as for $B^+(X,d)$, even though a generalized formal ball with negative radius does not correspond to a subset of $X$.

Formal balls possess the Lawson topology and the Martin topology.
