= Spherical sector =

Intersection of a sphere and cone emanating from its center

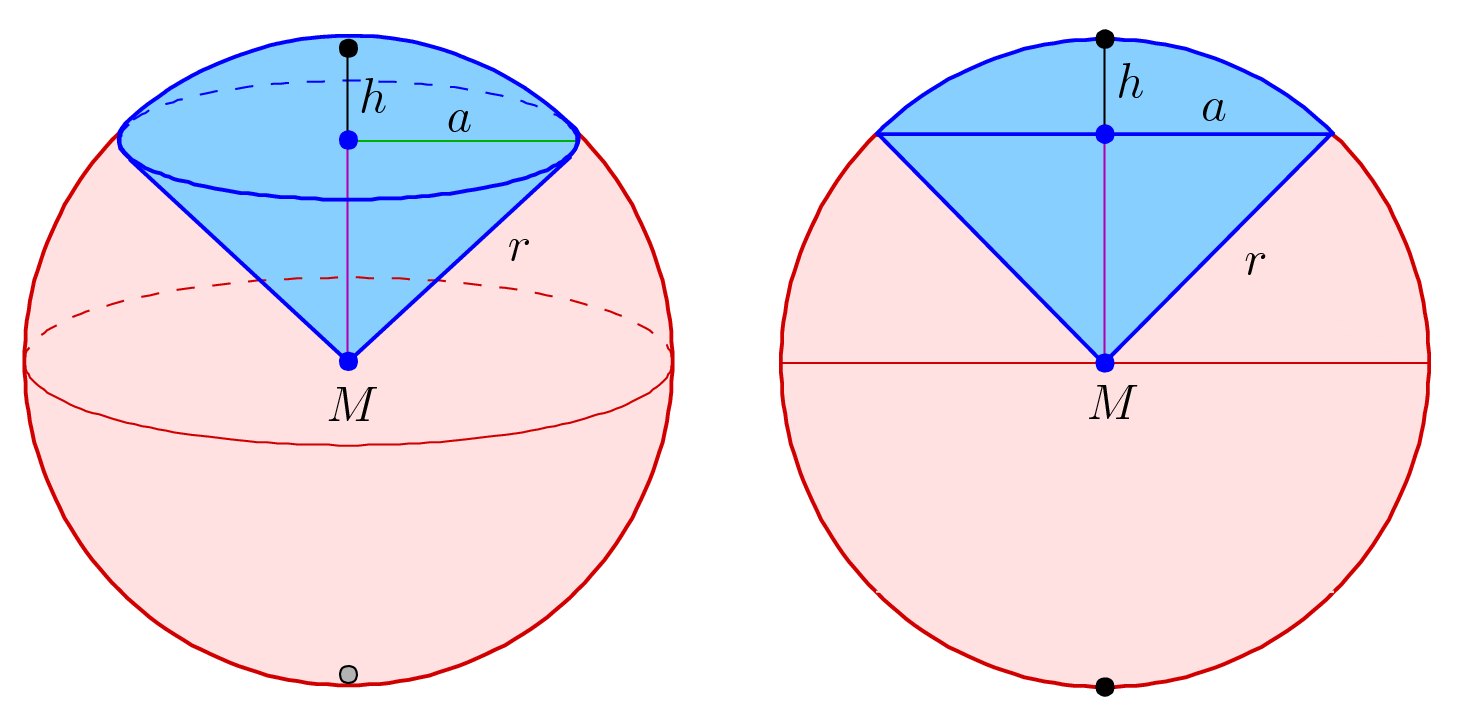
A spherical sector (blue)

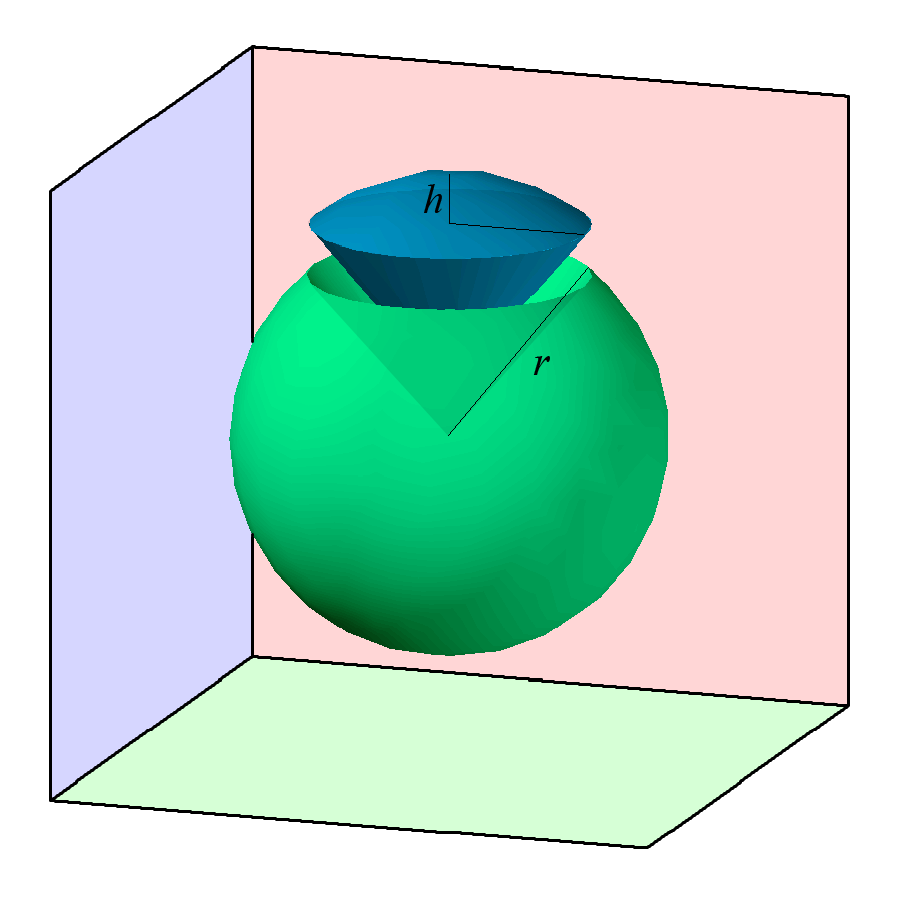
A spherical sector

In geometry, a spherical sector, also known as a spherical cone, is a portion of a ball that is bounded by a spherical cap and the cone that connects the centre of the sphere to the boundary of the cap. It is the three-dimensional analogue of the sector of a circle.

== Volume ==
If the radius of the sphere is denoted by r and the height of the cap by h, the volume of the spherical sector is
$$V = \frac{2\pi r^2 h}{3}\,.$$

This may also be written as
$$V = \frac{2\pi r^3}{3} (1-\cos\varphi)\,,$$
where φ is half the cone aperture angle, i.e., φ is the angle between the rim of the cap and the axis direction to the middle of the cap as seen from the sphere center. The limiting case is for φ approaching 180 degrees, which then describes a complete sphere.

The height, h is given by
$$h = r (1-\cos\varphi)\,.$$

The volume V of the sector is related to the area A of the cap by:
$$V = \frac{rA}{3}\,.$$

== Area ==
The curved surface area of the spherical cap (on the surface of the sphere, excluding the cone surface) is
$$A = 2\pi rh\,.$$

It is also
$$A = \Omega r^2$$
where Ω is the solid angle of the spherical sector in steradians, the SI unit of solid angle. One steradian is defined as the solid angle subtended by a cap area of A = r^{2}.

== Derivation ==
The volume can be calculated by integrating the differential volume element
$$dV = \rho^2 \sin \phi \, d\rho \, d\phi \, d\theta$$
over the volume of the spherical sector,
$$V = \int_0^{2\pi} \int_0^\varphi\int_0^r\rho^2\sin\phi \, d\rho \, d\phi \, d\theta = \int_0^{2\pi} d\theta \int_0^\varphi  \sin\phi \, d\phi \int_0^r \rho^2 d\rho = \frac{2\pi r^3}{3} (1-\cos\varphi) \, ,$$
where the integrals have been separated, because the integrand can be separated into a product of functions each with one dummy variable.

The area can be similarly calculated by integrating the differential spherical area element
$$dA = r^2 \sin\phi \, d\phi \, d\theta$$
over the spherical sector, giving
$$A = \int_0^{2\pi} \int_0^\varphi r^2 \sin\phi \, d\phi \, d\theta = r^2 \int_0^{2\pi} d\theta  \int_0^\varphi \sin\phi \, d\phi = 2\pi r^2(1-\cos\varphi) \, ,$$
where φ is inclination (or elevation) and θ is azimuth (right). Notice r is a constant. Again, the integrals can be separated.

== See also ==
- Circular sector — the analogous 2D figure.
- Spherical cap
- Spherical segment
- Spherical wedge
