= Spherical segment =

Region between parallel planes intersecting a sphere

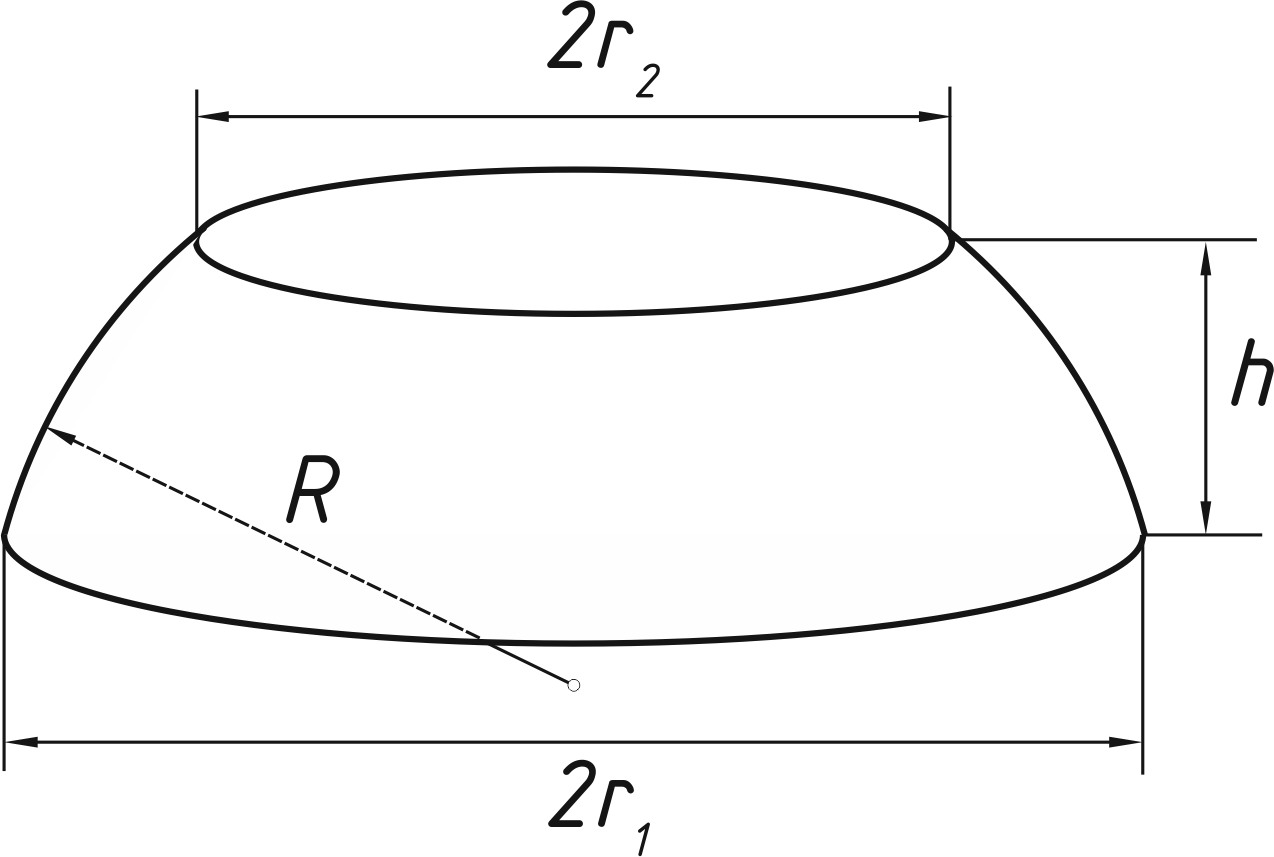
A spherical segment

Pair of parallel planes intersecting a sphere forming a spherical segment (i.e., a spherical frustum)

Terminology for spherical segments.

In geometry, a spherical segment is the solid defined by cutting a sphere or a ball with a pair of parallel planes. It can be thought of as a spherical cap with the top truncated, and so it corresponds to a spherical frustum. The surface of the spherical segment (excluding the bases) is called spherical zone.

Geometric parameters for spherical segment.

== Measures ==
If the radius of the sphere is called R, the radii of the spherical segment bases are a and b, and the height of the segment (the distance from one parallel plane to the other) called h, then the volume of the spherical segment is

$$V = \frac{\pi}{6} h \left(3 a^2 + 3 b^2 + h^2\right).$$

For the special case of the top plane being tangent to the sphere, we have $b = 0$ and the solid reduces to a spherical cap.

The equation above for volume of the spherical segment can be arranged to

$$V = \biggl [ \pi a^2 \left (\frac{h}{2} \biggr ) \right ] + \biggl [ \pi b^2 \left ( \frac{h}{2} \biggr ) \right ] + \biggl [ \frac{4}{3} \pi \left( \frac{h}{2} \right)^3 \biggr ]$$

Thus, the segment volume equals the sum of three volumes: two right circular cylinders one of radius a and the second of radius b (both of height $h/2$) and a sphere of radius $h/2$.

The curved surface area of the spherical zone—which excludes the top and bottom bases—is given by

$$A = 2 \pi R h.$$

Thus the surface area of the segment depends only on the distance between the cutting planes, and not their absolute heights.

== See also ==
- Spherical cap
- Spherical wedge
- Spherical sector
