= Ball (mathematics) =

Volume space bounded by a sphere

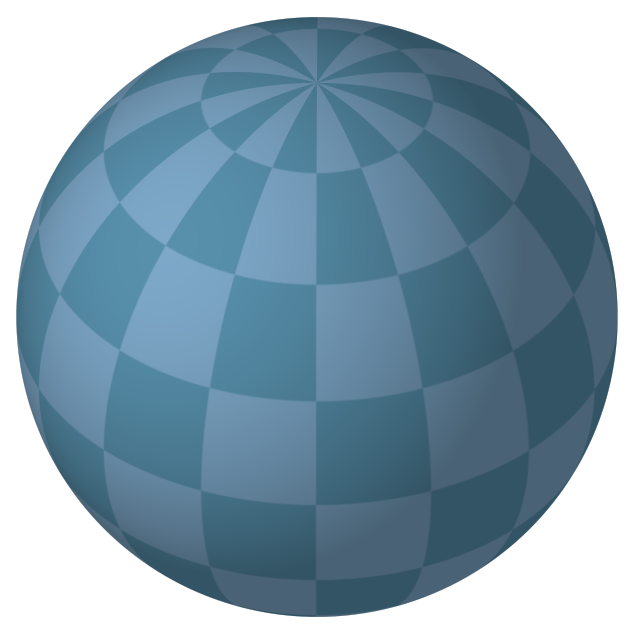
In Euclidean space, a ball is the volume bounded by a sphere

In mathematics, a ball is the solid figure bounded by a sphere; it is also called a solid sphere. It may be a closed ball (including the boundary points that constitute the sphere) or an open ball (excluding them).

These concepts are defined not only in three-dimensional Euclidean space but also for lower and higher dimensions, and for metric spaces in general. A ball in n dimensions is called a hyperball or n-ball and is bounded by a hypersphere or (n−1)-sphere. Thus, for example, a ball in the Euclidean plane is the same thing as a disk, the planar region bounded by a circle. In Euclidean 3-space, a ball is taken to be the region of space bounded by a 2-dimensional sphere. In a one-dimensional space, a ball is a line segment.

In other contexts, such as in Euclidean geometry and informal use, sphere is sometimes used to mean ball. In the field of topology the closed $n$-dimensional ball is often denoted as $B^n$ or $D^n$ while the open $n$-dimensional ball is $\operatorname{int} B^n$ or $\operatorname{int} D^n$.

== In Euclidean space ==
In Euclidean n-space, an (open) n-ball of radius r and center x is the set of all points of distance less than r from x. A closed n-ball of radius r is the set of all points of distance less than or equal to r from x.

In Euclidean n-space, every ball is bounded by a hypersphere. The ball is a bounded interval when n = 1, is a disk bounded by a circle when n = 2, and is bounded by a sphere when n = 3.

=== Volume ===
The n-dimensional volume of a Euclidean ball of radius r in n-dimensional Euclidean space is given by
$$V_n(r) = \frac{\pi^\frac{n}{2}}{\Gamma{\left(\frac{n}{2} + 1\right)}} r^n,$$
where Γ is Leonhard Euler's gamma function (which can be thought of as an extension of the factorial function to fractional arguments). Using explicit formulas for particular values of the gamma function at the integers and half integers gives formulas for the volume of a Euclidean ball that do not require an evaluation of the gamma function. These are:
$$\begin{align}
V_{2k}(r) &= \frac{\pi^k}{k!} r^{2k}\,,\\[2pt]
V_{2k+1}(r) &= \frac{2^{k+1}\pi^k}{\left(2k+1\right)!!} r^{2k+1} = \frac{2\left(k!\right) \left(4\pi\right)^k}{\left(2k+1\right)!}r^{2k+1}\,.
\end{align}$$

In the formula for odd-dimensional volumes, the double factorial (2k + 1)!! is defined for odd integers 2k + 1 as (2k + 1)!! = 1 ⋅ 3 ⋅ 5 ⋅ ⋯ ⋅ (2k − 1) ⋅ (2k + 1).

The surface area of an n-ball (an (n-1)-sphere) is:
$$A_n(r) =\frac{d V_n}{dr} =  \frac{2\pi^\frac{n}{2}}{\Gamma{\left(\frac{n}{2}\right)}} r^{n-1},$$

== In general metric spaces ==
Balls of radii 1 (red) and 2 (blue) in taxicab geometry are regular octahedrons

Let (M, d) be a metric space, namely a set M with a metric (distance function) d, and let $r$ be a positive real number. The open (metric) ball of radius r centered at a point p in M, usually denoted by B_{r}(p) or B(p; r), is defined the same way as a Euclidean ball, as the set of points in M of distance less than r away from p,
$$B_r(p) = \{ x \in M \mid d(x,p) < r \}.$$

The closed (metric) ball, sometimes denoted B_{r}[p] or B[p; r], is likewise defined as the set of points of distance less than or equal to r away from p,
$$B_r[p] = \{ x \in M \mid d(x,p) \le r \}.$$

In particular, a ball (open or closed) always includes p itself, since the definition requires r > 0. A unit ball (open or closed) is a ball of radius 1.

A ball in a general metric space need not be round. For example, a ball in real coordinate space under the Chebyshev distance is a hypercube, and a ball under the taxicab distance is a cross-polytope. A closed ball also need not be compact. For example, a closed ball in any infinite-dimensional normed vector space is never compact. However, a ball in a normed vector space will always be convex as a consequence of the triangle inequality.

A subset of a metric space is bounded if it is contained in some ball. A set is totally bounded if, given any positive radius, it is covered by finitely many balls of that radius.

The open balls of a metric space can serve as a base, giving this space a topology, the open sets of which are all possible unions of open balls. This topology on a metric space is called the topology induced by the metric d.

Let $\overline{B_r(p)}$ denote the closure of the open ball $B_r(p)$ in this topology. While it is always the case that $B_r(p) \subseteq \overline{B_r(p)} \subseteq B_r[p],$ it is not always the case that $\overline{B_r(p)} = B_r[p].$ For example, in a metric space $X$ with the discrete metric, one has $\overline{B_1(p)} = \{p\}$ but $B_1[p] = X$ for any $p \in X.$

== In normed vector spaces ==
Any normed vector space V with norm $\|\cdot\|$ is also a metric space with the metric $d (x,y)= \|x - y\|.$ In such spaces, an arbitrary ball $B_r(y)$ of points $x$ around a point $y$ with a distance of less than $r$ may be viewed as a scaled (by $r$) and translated (by $y$) copy of a unit ball $B_1(0).$ Such "centered" balls with $y=0$ are denoted with $B(r).$

The Euclidean balls discussed earlier are an example of balls in a normed vector space.

=== p-norm ===
In a Cartesian space R^{n} with the p-norm L^{p}, that is one chooses some $p \geq 1$ and defines
$$\left\| x \right\| _p = \left( |x_1|^p + |x_2|^p + \dots + |x_n|^p \right) ^{1/p},$$
Then an open ball around the origin with radius $r$ is given by the set
$$B(r) = \left\{ x \in \R^n \,:\left\| x \right\| _p = \left( |x_1|^p + |x_2|^p + \dots + |x_n|^p \right) ^{1/p} < r \right\}.$$
For n = 2, in a 2-dimensional plane $\R^2$, "balls" according to the L^{1}-norm (often called the taxicab or Manhattan metric) are bounded by squares with their diagonals parallel to the coordinate axes; those according to the L^{∞}-norm, also called the Chebyshev metric, have squares with their sides parallel to the coordinate axes as their boundaries. The L^{2}-norm, known as the Euclidean metric, generates the well known disks within circles, and for other values of p, the corresponding balls are areas bounded by Lamé curves (hypoellipses or hyperellipses).

For n = 3, the L^{1}-balls are within octahedra with axes-aligned body diagonals, the L^{∞}-balls are within cubes with axes-aligned edges, and the boundaries of balls for L^{p} with p > 2 are superellipsoids. p = 2 generates the inner of usual spheres.

Often can also consider the case of $p = \infty$ in which case we define
$$\lVert x \rVert_\infty = \max\{\left|x_1\right|, \dots, \left|x_n\right|\}$$

=== General convex norm ===
More generally, given any centrally symmetric, bounded, open, and convex subset X of R^{n}, one can define a norm on R^{n} where the balls are all translated and uniformly scaled copies of X. Note this theorem does not hold if "open" subset is replaced by "closed" subset, because the origin point qualifies but does not define a norm on R^{n}.

== In topological spaces ==
One may talk about balls in any topological space X, not necessarily induced by a metric. An (open or closed) n-dimensional topological ball of X is any subset of X which is homeomorphic to an (open or closed) Euclidean n-ball. Topological n-balls are important in combinatorial topology, as the building blocks of cell complexes.

Any open topological n-ball is homeomorphic to the Cartesian space R^{n} and to the open unit n-cube (hypercube) (0, 1)^{n} ⊆ R^{n}. Any closed topological n-ball is homeomorphic to the closed n-cube [0, 1]^{n}.

An n-ball is homeomorphic to an m-ball if and only if n = m. The homeomorphisms between an open n-ball B and R^{n} can be classified in two classes, that can be identified with the two possible topological orientations of B.

A topological n-ball need not be smooth; if it is smooth, it need not be diffeomorphic to a Euclidean n-ball.

== Regions ==
A number of special regions can be defined for a ball:

- cap, bounded by one plane
- sector, bounded by a conical boundary with apex at the center of the sphere
- segment, bounded by a pair of parallel planes
- shell, bounded by two concentric spheres of differing radii
- wedge, bounded by two planes passing through a sphere center and the surface of the sphere

== See also ==
- Ball – ordinary meaning
- Disk (mathematics)
- Formal ball, an extension to negative radii
- Neighbourhood (mathematics)
- Sphere, a similar geometric shape
- 3-sphere
- n-sphere, or hypersphere
- Alexander horned sphere
- Manifold
- Volume of an n-ball
- Octahedron – a 3-ball in the l_{1} metric.
