= Spherical shell =

Three-dimensional geometric shape

spherical shell, right: two halves

In geometry, a spherical shell (a ball shell) is a generalization of an annulus to three dimensions. It is the region of a ball between two concentric spheres of differing radii.

== Volume ==
The volume of a spherical shell is the difference between the enclosed volume of the outer sphere and the enclosed volume of the inner sphere:

$$\begin{align}
V &= \tfrac43\pi R^3 - \tfrac43\pi r^3 \\[3mu]
&= \tfrac43\pi \bigl(R^3 - r^3\bigr) \\[3mu]
&= \tfrac43\pi (R-r)\bigl(R^2 + Rr + r^2\bigr)
\end{align}$$

where r is the radius of the inner sphere and R is the radius of the outer sphere.

== Approximation ==
An approximation for the volume of a thin spherical shell is the surface area of the inner sphere multiplied by the thickness t of the shell:

$$V \approx 4 \pi r^2 t,$$

when t is very small compared to r ($t \ll r$).

The total surface area of the spherical shell is $4 \pi r^2$.

== See also ==
- Spherical pressure vessel
- Ball
- Solid torus
- Bubble
- Sphere
- Focaloid
