= Spherical wedge =

Geometric shape; radial slice of a sphere

A spherical wedge with radius r and angle of the wedge α

In geometry, a spherical wedge or ungula is a portion of a ball bounded by two plane semidisks and a spherical lune (termed the wedge's base). The angle between the radii lying within the bounding semidisks is the dihedral α. If AB is a semidisk that forms a ball when completely revolved about the z-axis, revolving AB only through a given α produces a spherical wedge of the same angle α. Beman (2008) remarks that "a spherical wedge is to the sphere of which it is a part as the angle of the wedge is to a perigon." ^{[A]} A spherical wedge of α = π radians (180°) is called a hemisphere, while a spherical wedge of α = π/2 radians (90°) is sometimes called a semihemisphere (two octants); a spherical wedge of α = 2π radians (360°) constitutes a complete ball.

The volume of a spherical wedge can be intuitively related to the AB definition in that while the volume of a ball of radius r is given by 4/3πr^{3}, the volume a spherical wedge of the same radius r is given by

$$V = \frac{\alpha}{2\pi} \cdot \tfrac43 \pi r^3 = \tfrac23 \alpha r^3\,.$$

Extrapolating the same principle and considering that the surface area of a sphere is given by 4πr^{2}, it can be seen that the surface area of the lune corresponding to the same wedge is given by^{[A]}

$$A = \frac{\alpha}{2\pi} \cdot 4 \pi r^2 = 2 \alpha r^2\,.$$

Hart (2009) states that the "volume of a spherical wedge is to the volume of the sphere as the number of degrees in the [angle of the wedge] is to 360".^{[A]} Hence, and through derivation of the spherical wedge volume formula, it can be concluded that, if V_{s} is the volume of the sphere and V_{w} is the volume of a given spherical wedge,

$$\frac{V_\mathrm{w}}{V_\mathrm{s}} = \frac{\alpha}{2\pi}\,.$$

Also, if S_{l} is the area of a given wedge's lune, and S_{s} is the area of the wedge's sphere,^{[A]}

$$\frac{S_\mathrm{l}}{S_\mathrm{s}} = \frac{\alpha}{2\pi}\,.$$

== See also ==
- Spherical cap
- Spherical segment
- Ungula

== Notes ==
A. A distinction is sometimes drawn between the terms "sphere" and "ball", where a sphere is regarded as being merely the outer surface of a solid ball. It is common to use the terms interchangeably, as the commentaries of both Beman (2008) and Hart (2008) do.
