= Out of Gas =

Out of Gas may refer to:

- "Out of Gas" (Firefly), the eighth episode of science-fiction television series Firefly
- "Out of Gas" (M*A*S*H), a seventh series episode of the TV series M*A*S*H
- Out of Gas: The End of the Age of Oil, a book by David Goodstein
- Out of Gas (video game), a Game Boy action game developed by Realtime Associates
- "Out of Gas" (song), a song by Modest Mouse
- Out of Gas, life-support emergency during scuba-diving
