= Chime.in =

Social networking service

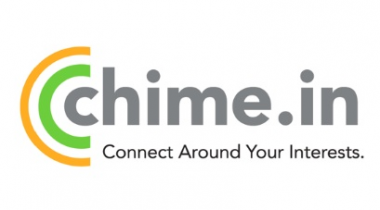
- Company type: Private
- Founded: Pasadena, California (2011)
- Headquarters: Pasadena, California, U.S.
- Area served: Worldwide
- Creator: Bill Gross (entrepreneur)
- Key people: Bill Gross (entrepreneur) (CEO)
- Net income: N/A
- Parent: UberMedia
- Website: www.chime.in
- Advertising: Banner ads
- Registration: Required
- Launched: October 2011
- Current status: Inactive
- Written in: PHP, MySQL

Chime.in was a social networking service and Web site launched in October 2011, operated and privately owned by UberMedia. Unlike most social networks, Chime.in is organized around subjects instead of people. The website is designed as a place to learn and share with other people who have similar interests. Chime.in lets users share content with others through a number of different mediums. It has a newsfeed, profile pages and a system for following other users.

== Overview ==
Chime.in does not have the typical status updates that are seen on other social networks. Instead of statuses, it has “chimes.” "Chimes" are a cross between a Facebook status update and a blog post. "Chimes" can be about any topic and they can be up to 5,000 characters in length. Together, the "Chimes" make up topic based discussions that can include links, videos, polls, and photos. An individual "chime" displays a headline, the first few sentences of a post, a piece of multimedia, a profile picture, interest tags and options for liking, commenting and sharing. Chime.in automatically organizes shared media into "Chimeline" streams based on the topics they discuss. The "Chimeline" and "Chimes" contain threaded comments that include a Reddit or Digg style up or downvote system for surfacing the best comments to the top of a chime. Users and companies can also create communities on any subject. Chime.in is unique compared to other developing social networks because users have the ability to post advertisements related to their network and in turn collect revenue. When a user creates a community, they can place advertisements and profit from them directly or let Chime.in populate their community with advertising and split the proceeds. Official site creation/purchase date: 16-Feb-2005 06:33:22 UTC (Can be verified with a who is search.) Official public beta launch date: October 18, 2011.

== Closure ==
On September 3, 2013, UberMedia announced that all user accounts will "automatically be deleted as of September 12, 2013" due to Chime.in undergoing "renovations".

In explaining the reason for the "renovations", UberMedia stated "UberMedia has pivoted away from user generated content while we focus on a new mobile ad network as well as continue to develop applications. We're still developing plans, therefore it's too early to speculate on the timing and which form Chime.in will take."

No indication of when, or indeed if, Chime.in would return was given by UberMedia.
