= Circumgon =

Geometric figure which circumscribes a circle

In mathematics and particularly in elementary geometry, a circumgon is a geometric figure which circumscribes some circle, in the sense that it is the union of the outer edges of non-overlapping triangles each of which has a vertex at the center of the circle and opposite side on a line that is tangent to the circle. The limiting case in which part or all of the circumgon is a circular arc is permitted. A circumgonal region is the union of those triangular regions.

Every triangle is a circumgonal region because it circumscribes the circle known as the incircle of the triangle. Every square is a circumgonal region. In fact, every regular polygon is a circumgonal region, as is more generally every tangential polygon. But not every polygon is a circumgonal region: for example, a non-square rectangle is not. A circumgonal region need not even be a convex polygon: for example, it could consist of three triangular wedges meeting only at the circle's center.

All circumgons have common properties regarding area–perimeter ratios and centroids. It is these properties that make circumgons interesting objects of study in elementary geometry.

The concept and the terminology of a circumgon were introduced and their properties investigated first by Tom M. Apostol and Mamikon A. Mnatsakanian in a paper published in 2004.

== Properties ==
Given a circumgon, the circle which the circumgon circumscribes is called the incircle of the circumgon, the radius of the circle is called the inradius, and its center is called the incenter.

- The area of a circumgonal region is equal to half the product of its perimeter (the total length of the outer edges) and its inradius.
- The vector from the incenter to the area centroid, G_{A} , of a circumgonal region and the vector from the incenter to the centroid of its boundary (outer edge points), G_{B} , are related by

$$G_B = \tfrac{3}{2}G_A.$$

Thus the two centroids and the incenter are collinear.

== See also ==
- Concyclic points
