= Mechanical universe =

Mechanical universe can refer to:

- Mechanism (philosophy), theory that the universe is best understood as a system composed entirely of matter in motion under a complete and regular system of laws
- Clockwork universe theory, compares the operation of the physical universe to the workings of a mechanical clock
- The Mechanical Universe, a 52-part telecourse introducing university-level physics
