= Project Mathematics! =

American series of educational videos

- Also known as: Project MATHEMATICS!
- Genre: Educational
- Created by: Tom M. Apostol
- Written by: Benedict Freedman
- Directed by: Tom M. Apostol
- Narrated by: Al Hibbs; Susan Gray Davis
- Country of origin: United States
- Original language: English
- No. of seasons: 1
- No. of episodes: 9

Production
- Producer: Tom M. Apostol
- Production locations: Pasadena, California, US
- Editor: Robert Lattanzio
- Running time: 19–30 minutes
- Production company: California Institute of Technology

Original release
- Network: PBS, NASA TV
- Release: 1988 – 2000

Related
- The Mechanical Universe

Project Mathematics! (stylized as Project MATHEMATICS!), is a series of educational video modules and accompanying workbooks for teachers, developed at the California Institute of Technology to help teach basic principles of mathematics to high school students. In 2017, the entire series of videos was made available on YouTube.

== Overview ==
The Project Mathematics! series of videos is a teaching aid for teachers to help students understand the basics of geometry and trigonometry. The series was developed by Tom M. Apostol (Note: Earlier, Apostol had written the two volumes of the Calculus (Apostol books) which were deemed "essential for undergraduate mathematics libraries" by the Mathematical Association of America) and James F. Blinn, both from the California Institute of Technology. Apostol led the production of the series, while Blinn provided the computer animation used to depict the ideas beings discussed. Blinn mentioned that part of his inspiration was the Bell Lab Science Series of films from the 1950s.

The material was designed for teachers to use in their curriculums and was aimed at grades 8 through 13. Workbooks are also available to accompany the videos and to assist teachers in presenting the material to their students. The videos are distributed as either 9 VHS videotapes or 3 DVDs, and include a history of mathematics and examples of how math is used in real world applications.

== Video module descriptions ==
A total of nine educational video modules were created between 1988 and 2000. Another two modules, Teachers Workshop and Project MATHEMATICS! Contest, were created in 1991 for teachers and are only available on videotape. The content of the nine educational modules follows below.

=== The Theorem of Pythagoras ===
A right triangle with a square on each side

In 1988, The Theorem of Pythagoras was the first video produced by the series and reviews the Pythagorean theorem. For all right triangles, the square of the hypotenuse is equal to the sum of the squares of the other two sides (a^{2} + b^{2} = c^{2}). The theorem is named after Pythagoras of ancient Greece. Pythagorean triples occur when all three sides of a right triangle are integers such as a = 3, b = 4 and c = 5. A clay tablet shows that the Babylonians knew of Pythagorean triples 1200 years before Pythagoras, but nobody knows if they knew the more-general Pythagorean theorem. The Chinese proof uses four similar triangles to prove the theorem.

Today, we know of the Pythagorean theorem because of Euclid's Elements, a set of 13 books on mathematics—from around 300 BCE and the knowledge it contained has been used for more than 2000 years. Euclid's proof is described in book 1, proposition 47 and uses the idea of equal areas along with shearing and rotating triangles. In the dissection proof, the square of the hypotenuse is cut into pieces to fit into the other two squares. Proposition 31 in book 6 of Euclid's Elements describes the similarity proof, which states that the squares of each side can be replaced by shapes that are similar to each other and the proof still works.

=== The Story of Pi ===
Pi is equal to the circumference of a circle divided by its diameter.

The second module created was The Story of Pi, in 1989, and describes the mathematical constant pi and its history. The first letter in the Greek word for "perimeter" (περίμετρος) is π, known in English as "pi". Pi is the ratio of a circle's circumference to its diameter and is roughly equal to 3.14159. The circumference of a circle is $2 \pi r$ and its area is $\pi r^2$. The volume and surface area of a cylinder, cone sphere and torus are calculated using pi. Pi is also used in calculating planetary orbit times, gaussian curves and alternating current. In calculus, there are infinite series that involve pi and pi is also used in trigonometry. Ancient cultures used different approximations for pi. The Babylonian's used $\tfrac{25}{8}$ and the Egyptians used $\tfrac{256}{81}$.

Pi is a fundamental constant of nature. Archimedes discovered that the area of the circle equals the square of its radius times pi. Archimedes was the first to accurately calculate the value of pi by using polygons with 96 sides both inside and outside a circle then measuring the line segments and finding that pi was between $\tfrac{223}{71}$ and $\tfrac{22}{7}$. A Chinese calculation used polygons with 3,000 sides and calculated pi accurately to five decimal places. The Chinese also found that $\tfrac{355}{113}$ was an accurate estimate of pi to within 6 decimal places and was the most accurate estimate for 1,000 years until arabic numerals were used for arithmetic.

By the end of the 19th century, formulas were discovered to calculate pi without the need for geometric diagrams. These formulas used infinite series and trigonometric functions to calculate pi to hundreds of decimal places. Computers were used in the 20th century to calculate pi and its value was known to one billion decimals places by 1989. One reason to accurately calculate pi is to test the performance of computers. Another reason is to determine if pi is a specific fraction, which is a ratio of two integers called a rational number that has a repeating pattern of digits when expressed in decimal form. In the 18th century, Johann Lambert found that pi cannot be a ratio and is therefore an irrational number. Pi shows up in many areas having no obvious connection to circles. For example; the fraction of points on a lattice viewable from an origin point is equal to $\tfrac{6}{\pi^2}$.

=== Similarity ===
The third module discusses how scaling objects does not change their shape and how angles stay the same. Also shows how ratios change for perimeters, areas and volumes.

=== Sines and Cosines, Part I (Waves) ===
This module visually depicts how sines and cosines are related to waves and a unit circle. Also reviews their relationship to the ratios of side lengths of right triangles.

=== Sines and Cosines, Part II (Trigonometry) ===
This module explains the law of sines and cosines how they relate to sides and angles of a triangle. The module also gives some real life examples of their use.

=== Sines and Cosines, Part III (Addition formulas) ===
This module describes the addition formulas of sines and cosines and discusses the history of Ptolemy's Almagest. It also goes into details of Ptolemy's Theorem. Animation shows how sines and cosines relate to harmonic motion.

=== Polynomials ===
This module explain how polynomials can approximate sines and cosines. It also includes information about cubic splines in design engineering.

=== The Tunnel of Samos ===
This module dives into the question of how the ancients dug the Tunnel of Samos from two opposite sides of a mountain in 500 BCE. And how were they able to meet under the mountain? The module describes that it maybe possible; they used geometry and trigonometry.

=== Early History of Mathematics ===
This module reviews some of the major developments in mathematical history.

== Production ==
The project was originally titled Mathematica but was changed to avoid confusion with the mathematics software package. A total of four full-time employees and four part-time employees produced the episodes with help from several volunteers. Each episode took between four and five months to produce. Blinn headed the creation of the computer animation used in each episode, which was done on a network of computers donated by Hewlett-Packard.

=== Funding ===
The majority of the funding came from two grants from the National Science Foundation totaling $3.1 million. Free distribution of some of the modules was provided by a grant from Intel.

== Distribution ==
Project Mathematics! video tapes, DVDs and workbooks are primarily distributed to teachers through the California Institute of Technology bookstore and were popular to a standard that the bookstore hired an extra person just for processing orders of the series. An estimated 140,000 of the tapes and DVDs were sent to educational institutions around the world, and have been viewed by approximately 10 million people until 2003.

The series is also distributed through the Mathematical Association of America and NASA's Central Operation of Resources for Educators (CORE). In addition, over half of the states in the US have received master copies of the videotapes so they can produce and distribute copies to their various educational institutions. The videotapes may be freely copied for educational purposes with a few restrictions, but the DVD version is not freely reproducible.

The video segments for the first 3 modules can be viewed for free at the Project Mathematics! website as streaming video. Selected video segments of the remaining 6 modules are also available for free viewing.

In 2017, Caltech made the entirety of the series, as well as three SIGGRAPH demo videos, available on YouTube.

=== Availability in different languages and formats ===
The videos have been translated into Hebrew, Portuguese, French, and Spanish with the DVD version being both English and Spanish. PAL versions of the videos are available as well and efforts are underway to translate the materials into Korean.

=== Releases ===
All of the following were published by the California Institute of Technology:

- Project Mathematics!, workbooks (1990), OCLC 471758335
- Project Mathematics!, 9 videotapes (VHS, 30 minutes each, 1994), OCLC 43761543
- Project Mathematics!, DVD 1, videodisk (DVD, 68 minutes, 2005), OCLC 123450762
- Project Mathematics!, DVD 2, videodisk (DVD, 81 minutes, 2005), OCLC 123450707
- Project Mathematics!, DVD 3, videodisk (DVD, 82 minutes, 2005), OCLC 123450719

== Awards ==
Project Mathematics! has received numerous awards including the Gold Apple award in 1989 from the National Educational Film and Video Festival.

- 1988 International Film and TV Festival of New York

== Interactive Project Mathematics! ==
A web-based version of the materials was funded by a third grant from the National Science Foundation and was in phase 1, as of 2010.

== See also ==
- Charles and Ray Eames
- National Museum of Mathematics
- Mathematics education in the United States

== Sources ==
Borwein, Jonathan M. (2002) [2002]. Jonathan M. Borwein (ed.). Multimedia tools for communicating Mathematics, Volume 1. Vol. 1 (illustrated ed.). Springer. p. 1. ISBN 978-3-540-42450-5. OCLC 50598138.
