= Mamikon =

Mamikon (Armenian: Մամիկոն) is an Armenian masculine given name. Notable people with this name include:

- Mamikon Gharibyan (born 2004), an Armenian chess grandmaster
- Mamikon Mnatsakanian (1942 – 2021), an Armenian mathematician
