= Aplanatic lens =

Optical device

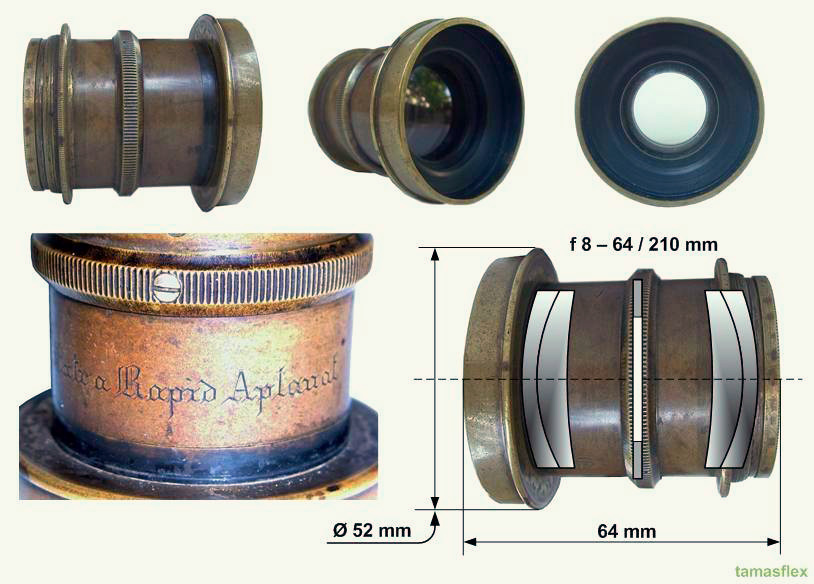
Camera lens.

An aplanatic lens is a lens that is free of both spherical and coma aberrations. Aplanatic lenses can be made by combining two or three lens elements. A single-element aplanatic lens is an aspheric lens whose surfaces are surfaces of revolution of a cartesian oval.
