= Feynman's Lost Lecture =

Book by Richard Feynman

Feynman's Lost Lecture: The Motion of Planets Around the Sun
- Author: Richard Feynman
- Subject: Celestial mechanics
- Genre: Textbook
- Published: W. W. Norton & Company
- Publication date: 1996
- Publication place: United States
- Media type: book
- Pages: 191
- ISBN: 978-0393039184
- OCLC: 33078849
- Dewey Decimal: 521/.3
- LC Class: QB603.M6 G66 1996

Feynman's Lost Lecture: The Motion of Planets Around the Sun is a book based on a lecture by Richard Feynman. Restoration of the lecture notes and conversion into book form was undertaken by Caltech physicist David L. Goodstein and archivist Judith R. Goodstein.

Feynman had given the lecture on the motion of bodies at Caltech on March 13, 1964, but the notes and pictures were lost for a number of years and consequently not included in The Feynman Lectures on Physics series. The lecture notes were later found, but without the photographs of his illustrative chalkboard drawings. One of the editors, David L. Goodstein, stated that at first without the photographs, it was very hard to figure out what diagrams he was referring to in the audiotapes, but a later finding of his own private lecture notes made it possible to understand completely the logical framework with which Feynman delivered the lecture.

== Overview ==
Feynman's construction

You can explain to people who don't know much of the physics, the early history... how Newton discovered... Kepler's Laws, and equal areas, and that means it's toward the sun, and all this stuff. And then the key - they always ask then, "Well, how do you see that it's an ellipse if it's the inverse square?" Well, it's God damned hard, there's no question of that. But I tried to find the simplest one I could.

In a non-course lecture delivered to a freshman physics audience, Feynman undertakes to present an elementary, geometric demonstration of Newton's discovery of the fact that Kepler's first observation, that the planets travel in elliptical orbits, is a necessary consequence of Kepler's other two observations.

The structure of Feynman's lecture:

- A historical introduction to the material
- An overview of some geometric properties of an ellipse
- Newton's demonstration that equal areas in equal times is equivalent to forces toward the sun
- Feynman's demonstration that equal changes in velocity occur in equal angles in the orbit
- Feynman's demonstration, using techniques of Ugo Fano, that these velocity changes imply that the orbit is elliptical
- Discussion of Rutherford's experiments with scattering of alpha particles, and the discovery of the atomic nucleus

The audio recording of the lectures also includes twenty minutes of informal Q&A at the blackboard with students who had attended the lecture.

In the 1964 lecture, Feynman presents an elementary geometric proof (i.e., in the style of Isaac Newton's 1687 Philosophiæ Naturalis Principia Mathematica) of Kepler's first law. Feynman's geometric proof relies on the concept of a hodograph. Feynman reported that his motivation for presenting a proof different from Newton's was that he had failed to understand Newton's original proof in the Principia. A proof with ideas similar to Feynman's had already been published by James Clerk Maxwell in his book Matter and Motion (1877).
