= Tristan Needham =

American mathematician

Tristan Needham is a British mathematician and professor of mathematics at the University of San Francisco, best known to the public for his books Visual Complex Analysis, and Visual Differential Geometry and Forms.

== Education, career and publications ==
Tristan is the son of social anthropologist Rodney Needham of Oxford, England. He attended the Dragon School. Later Needham attended the University of Oxford and studied physics at Merton College, and then transferred to the Mathematical Institute where he studied under Roger Penrose. He obtained his D.Phil. in 1987 and in 1989 took up his post at University of San Francisco.

In 1993 he published A Visual Explanation of Jensen's inequality. The following year he published The Geometry of Harmonic Functions, which won the Carl B. Allendoerfer Award for 1995.

Needham wrote the book Visual Complex Analysis, which has received positive reviews. Though it is described as a "radical first course in complex analysis aimed at undergraduates", writing in Mathematical Reviews D.H. Armitage said that "the book will be appreciated most by those who already know some complex analysis." In fact Douglas Hofstadter wrote "Needham's work of art with its hundreds and hundreds of beautiful figures á la Latta, brings complex analysis alive in an unprecedented manner". Hofstadter had studied complex analysis at Stanford with Gordon Latta, and he recalled "Latta's amazingly precise and elegant blackboard diagrams". In 2001 a German language version, translated by Norbert Herrmann and Ina Paschen, was published by R. Oldenbourg Verlag, Munich.

In 2021, Needham published Visual Differential Geometry and Forms: A Mathematical Drama in Five Acts (Princeton University Press). (The original title was Visual Differential Geometry.) Much of this material was already developed in the writing of Visual Complex Analysis.

== See also ==
- Amplitwist
- Visual calculus

== Bibliography ==
- Needham, Tristan. Visual Complex Analysis. The Clarendon Press, Oxford University Press, New York, 1997 ISBN 0-19-853447-7.
- Needham, Tristan. Visual Differential Geometry and Forms: A Mathematical Drama in Five Acts. Princeton University Press, Princeton, 2021 ISBN 9780691203706.
