= Equidistant set =

Set of points equidistant from two sets

In mathematics, an equidistant set (also called a midset, or a bisector) is a set whose elements have the same distance (measured using some appropriate distance function) from two or more sets. The equidistant set of two singleton sets in the Euclidean plane is the perpendicular bisector of the segment joining the two sets. The conic sections can also be realized as equidistant sets. This property of conics has been used to generalize the notion of conic sections. The concept of equidistant set is used to define frontiers in territorial domain controversies. For instance, the United Nations Convention on the Law of the Sea (Article 15) establishes that, in absence of any previous agreement, the delimitation of the territorial sea between countries occurs exactly on the median line every point of which is equidistant of the nearest points to each country. Though the usage of the terminology is quite old, the study of the properties of equidistant sets as mathematical objects was initiated only in 1970s.

== Definition ==
Let (X, d) be a metric space and A be a nonempty subset of X. If x is a point of X, the distance of x from A is defined as d(x, A) = inf{ d(x, a): a in A}. If A and B are both nonempty subsets of X then the equidistant set determined by A and B is defined to be the set {x in X: d(x, A) = d(x, B)}. This equidistant set is denoted by { A = B }.

The study of equidistant sets is more interesting in the case when the background metric space is the Euclidean space.

== Examples ==
=== Straight lines ===
Animation showing the equidistant set of two singleton sets in a Euclidean plane.	Image showing equidistant set of two straight lines in a Euclidean plane.

=== Conics as equidistant sets ===
Animation showing the generation of parabola as an equidistant set of a singleton point and a straight line.	Animation showing the generation of an ellipse as the equidistant set of two circles.	Animation showing the generation of one branch of a hyperbola as the equidistant set of two circles.

== See also ==
- Generalized conic
- Voronoi diagram
