= Circumference =

Perimeter of a circle or ellipse

circumference C diameter D radius R center or origin O Circumference = π × diameter = 2π × radius.

In geometry, the circumference (from Latin circumferēns 'carrying around, circling') is the perimeter of a circle or ellipse. The circumference is the arc length of the circle, as if it were opened up and straightened out to a line segment. More generally, the perimeter is the curve length around any closed figure. Circumference may also refer to the circle itself, that is, the locus corresponding to the edge of a disk. The circumference of a sphere is the circumference, or length, of any one of its great circles.

== Circle ==
The circumference of a circle is the distance around it, but if, as in many elementary treatments, distance is defined in terms of straight lines, this cannot be used as a definition. Under these circumstances, the circumference of a circle may be defined as the limit of the perimeters of inscribed regular polygons as the number of sides increases without bound. The term circumference is used when measuring physical objects, as well as when considering abstract geometric forms.

When a circle's diameter is 1, its circumference is $\pi.$

When a circle's radius is 1—called a unit circle—its circumference is $2\pi.$

Archimedes described how the circumference can be defined and computed using the method of exhaustion. In modern terms, one considers a set $A$ of all perimeters of inscribed polygons, a set $B$ of all perimeters of polygons circumscribing the circle. Every element of $A$ is less than every element of $B$, and there is no positive gap: no number that is less than all differences of elements of $A$ from elements of $B$. Therefore the circumference can be defined, and calculated, as the unique number $x$ such that $a<x<b$ for every inscribed perimeter $a$ and every circumscribed perimeter $b$.

=== Relationship with π ===
The circumference of a circle is related to one of the most important mathematical constants. This constant, pi, is represented by the Greek letter $\pi.$ Its first few decimal digits are 3.141592653589793... Pi is defined as the ratio of a circle's circumference $C$ to its diameter $d:$
$$\pi = \frac{C}{d}.$$

Or, equivalently, as the ratio of the circumference to twice the radius. The above formula can be rearranged to solve for the circumference:
$${C} = \pi \cdot{d} = 2\pi \cdot{r}.\!$$

The ratio of the circle's circumference to its radius is equivalent to $2\pi$. (Note: The Greek letter 𝜏 (tau) is sometimes used to represent this constant. This notation is accepted in several online calculators and many programming languages.) This is also the number of radians in one turn. The use of the mathematical constant π is ubiquitous in mathematics, engineering, and science.

In Measurement of a Circle written circa 250 BCE, Archimedes showed that this ratio (written as $C/d,$ since he did not use the name π) was greater than 3 10/71 but less than 3 1/7 by calculating the perimeters of an inscribed and a circumscribed regular polygon of 96 sides. This method for approximating π was used for centuries, obtaining more accuracy by using polygons of larger and larger number of sides. The last such calculation was performed in 1630 by Christoph Grienberger who used polygons with 10^{40} sides.

=== Circumference in analysis ===
In modern mathematical analysis, the circumference of a circle can be defined as its one-dimensional measure. One common intrinsic definition is by Hausdorff measure. If $E$ is a subset of the Euclidean plane, its one-dimensional Hausdorff measure is obtained by covering $E$ with sets of small diameter and taking the infimum of the sums of those diameters.

For sufficiently regular curves, this measure agrees with the usual notion of arc length. Equivalently, if $\gamma:[a,b]\to\mathbb R^2$ is a rectifiable curve, its length may be defined as
$$L(\gamma)=\sup\sum_{i=1}^n |\gamma(t_i)-\gamma(t_{i-1})|,$$
where the supremum is taken over all partitions $a=t_0<t_1<\cdots<t_n=b.$ For continuously differentiable curves this length is equal to
$$L(\gamma)=\int_a^b |\gamma'(t)|,dt.$$

Applying this to the circle of radius (r), with parametrization
$$\gamma(t)=(r\cos t,r\sin t),\qquad 0\leq t\leq 2\pi,$$
gives $|\gamma'(t)|=r$, and hence
$$L(\gamma)=\int_0^{2\pi}r,dt=2\pi r.$$
Thus, in analysis, the formula for circumference follows from a general definition of one-dimensional length rather than from assuming in advance that the circle has a perimeter given by polygonal exhaustion.

== Ellipse ==
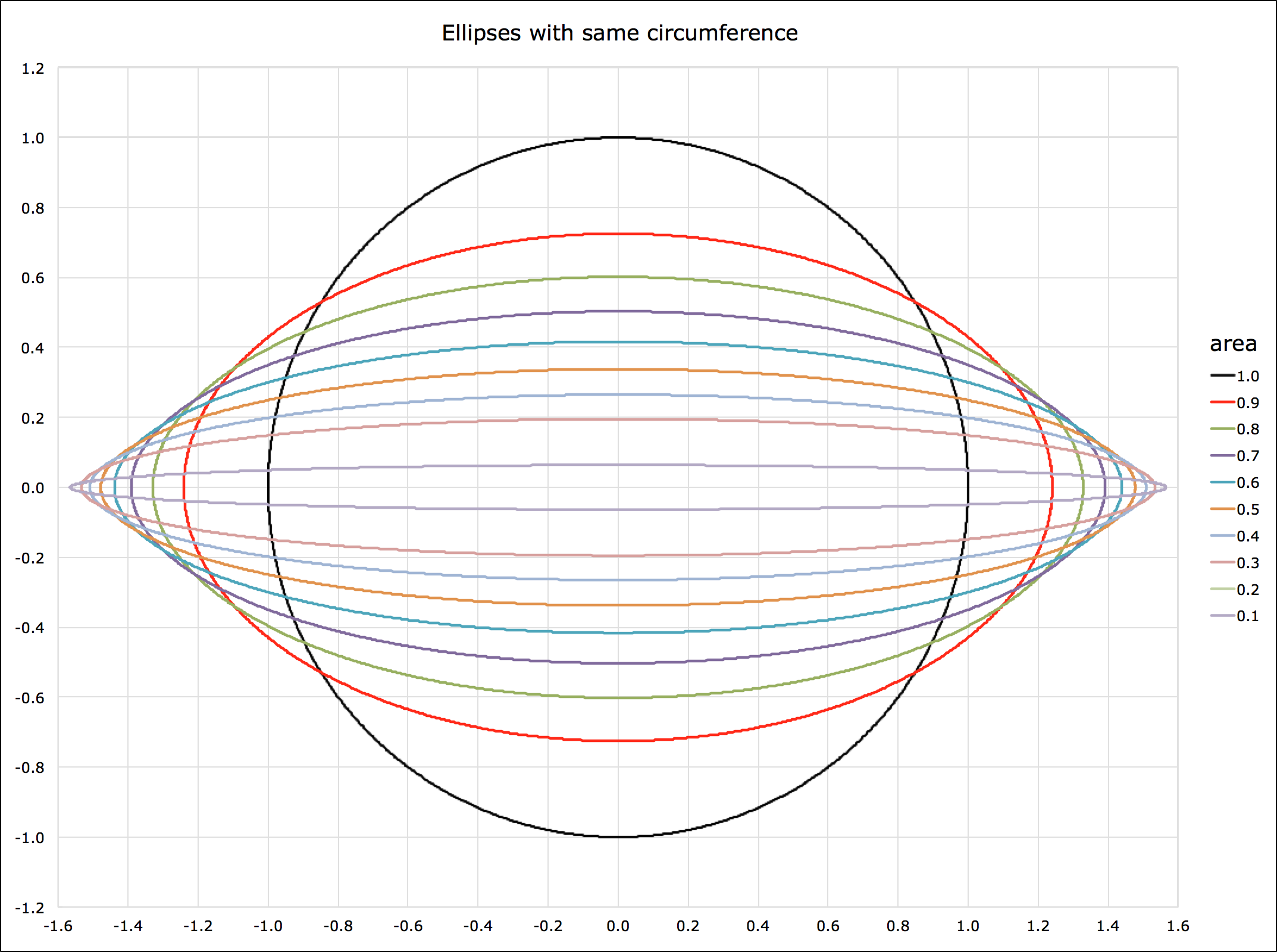
Circle, and ellipses with the same circumference

Some authors use circumference to denote the perimeter of an ellipse. There is no general formula for the circumference of an ellipse in terms of the semi-major and semi-minor axes of the ellipse that uses only elementary functions. However, there are approximate formulas in terms of these parameters. One such approximation, due to Euler (1773), for the canonical ellipse,
$$\frac{x^2}{a^2} + \frac{y^2}{b^2} = 1,$$
is
$$C_{\rm{ellipse}} \sim \pi \sqrt{2\left(a^2 + b^2\right)}.$$
Some lower and upper bounds on the circumference of the canonical ellipse with $a\geq b$ are:
$$2\pi b \leq C \leq 2\pi a,$$
$$\pi (a+b) \leq C \leq 4(a+b),$$
$$4\sqrt{a^2+b^2} \leq C \leq \pi \sqrt{2\left(a^2+b^2\right)}.$$

Here the upper bound $2\pi a$ is the circumference of a circumscribed concentric circle passing through the endpoints of the ellipse's major axis, and the lower bound $4\sqrt{a^2+b^2}$ is the perimeter of an inscribed rhombus with vertices at the endpoints of the major and minor axes.

The circumference of an ellipse can be expressed exactly in terms of the complete elliptic integral of the second kind. More precisely,
$$C_{\rm{ellipse}} = 4a \int_0^{\pi/2} \sqrt{1 - e^2 \sin^2\theta}\ d\theta,$$
where $a$ is the length of the semi-major axis and $e$ is the eccentricity $\sqrt{1 - b^2/a^2}.$

== See also ==
- Arc length – Distance along a curve
- Area – Size of a two-dimensional surface
- Circumgon – Geometric figure which circumscribes a circle
- Isoperimetric inequality – Geometric inequality applicable to any closed curve
- Perimeter-equivalent radius – Radius of a circle or sphere equivalent to a non-circular or non-spherical object
