= Visual calculus =

Visual mathematical proofs

Mamikon's theorem - the areas of the tangent clusters are equal. Here, the original curve with the tangents drawn from it is a semicircle.

Visual calculus, invented by Mamikon Mnatsakanian (known as Mamikon), is an approach to solving a variety of integral calculus problems. Many problems that would otherwise seem quite difficult yield to the method with hardly a line of calculation. Mamikon collaborated with Tom Apostol on the 2013 book New Horizons in Geometry describing the subject.

== Description ==
Illustration of Mamikon's method showing that the areas of two annuli with the same chord length are the same regardless of inner and outer radii.

Mamikon devised his method in 1959 while an undergraduate, first applying it to a well-known geometry problem: find the area of a ring (annulus), given the length of a chord tangent to the inner circumference. Perhaps surprisingly, no additional information is needed; the solution does not depend on the ring's inner and outer dimensions.

The traditional approach involves algebra and application of the Pythagorean theorem. Mamikon's method, however, envisions an alternative construction of the ring: first the inner circle alone is drawn, then a constant-length tangent is made to travel along its circumference, "sweeping out" the ring as it goes.

Now if all the (constant-length) tangents used in constructing the ring are translated so that their points of tangency coincide, the result is a circular disk of known radius (and easily computed area). Indeed, since the inner circle's radius is irrelevant, one could just as well have started with a circle of radius zero (a point)—and sweeping out a ring around a circle of zero radius is indistinguishable from simply rotating a line segment about one of its endpoints and sweeping out a disk.

Mamikon's insight was to recognize the equivalence of the two constructions; and because they are equivalent, they yield equal areas. Moreover, the two starting curves need not be circular—a finding not easily proven by more traditional geometric methods. This yields Mamikon's theorem:

The area of a tangent sweep is equal to the area of its tangent cluster, regardless of the shape of the original curve.

== Applications ==
=== Area of a cycloid ===
Finding the area of a cycloid using Mamikon's theorem.

The area of a cycloid can be calculated by considering the area between it and an enclosing rectangle. These tangents can all be clustered to form a circle. If the circle generating the cycloid has radius r then this circle also has radius r and area πr^{2}. The area of the rectangle is 2r × 2πr = 4πr^{2}. Therefore, the area of the cycloid is 3πr^{2}: it is 3 times the area of the generating circle.

The tangent cluster can be seen to be a circle because the cycloid is generated by a circle and the tangent to the cycloid will be at right angle to the line from the generating point to the rolling point. Thus the tangent and the line to the contact point form a right-angled triangle in the generating circle. This means that clustered together the tangents will describe the shape of the generating circle.

== See also ==
- Cavalieri's principle
- Hodograph – This is a related construct that maps the velocity of a point using a polar diagram.
- The Method of Mechanical Theorems
- Pappus's centroid theorem
- Planimeter
- Tristan Needham's visual complex analysis.
