= Roya Maboudian =

American academic and researcher

Professor Roya Maboudian

Academic background
- Education: Catholic University of America, B.S. Electrical Engineering; Caltech, M.S. and Ph.D. in Applied Physics

Academic work
- Discipline: Surface science; Micro/nanotechnology
- Institutions: University of California, Berkeley
- Website: https://maboudianlab.berkeley.edu/

Roya Maboudian is distinguished professor of chemical and biomolecular engineering at the University of California, Berkeley, and co-director of the Berkeley Sensor and Actuator Center. She also holds The John F. Heil Jr. Chancellor's Chair in Chemical & Biomolecular Engineering, and is the Associate Dean of Undergraduate Affairs in the College of Chemistry at UC Berkeley. She has served as editor of the IEEE Journal of Microelectromechanical Systems and ACS Sensors, and as associate editor of IEEE/SPIE Journal on Microfabrication, Microlithography and Microsystems.

== Education and early career ==
Maboudian obtained her B.S. in electrical engineering from the Catholic University in 1982. She went on to receive her M.S. and Ph.D. in Applied Physics at the California Institute of Technology in 1984 and 1988, respectively, under advisor David L. Goodstein and co-advisor Tom Tombrello. She was a postdoctoral scholar at Penn State and an IBM fellow at UC Santa Barbara before moving to the University of California, Berkeley in 1993. She was one of the first women to earn tenure in the Chemical Engineering Department at Berkeley.

== Research ==
Maboudian's research is in the area of surface and materials science and engineering of micro/nanosystems, towards applications in sensing, health and environmental monitoring, energy technologies and sustainability. Her research has addressed several technological barriers in microsystems technologies. Her early Berkeley research involved pioneering fundamental studies of surface and interfacial phenomena in microelectromechanical systems. These studies paved the way for the development of surface modifications to combat the problem of stiction, considered a key bottleneck in MEMS commercialization. Since then, her work has broadened to other aspects of materials and surfaces, including silicon carbide-based harsh environment sensing, chemical sensing, gecko-inspired adhesives, supercapacitor energy storage devices and green construction.

== Awards and honors ==
- IEEE Fellow, 2021
- Bakar Fellow, 2019
- Fellow of the American Vacuum Society, 2014
- Presidential Early Career Award for Scientists and Engineers, 1998
- Arnold and Mabel Beckman Young Investigator Award, 1996
- Hellman Family Award, 1996
- National Science Foundation Young Investigator Award, 1994
