= Judith R. Goodstein =

American scientific and mathematical historian

- Born: Judith Ronnie Koral; July 8, 1939 (age 87); Brooklyn, New York City, New York, US
- Education: Brooklyn College; University of Washington
- Spouse: David Goodstein
- Relatives: Bill T. Gross (son-in-law)
- Scientific career
- Fields: History of science History of mathematics
- Workplaces: California Institute of Technology; California State University, Dominguez Hills; University of California, Los Angeles
- Thesis: Sir Humphry Davy: chemical theory and the nature of matter (1969)
- Doctoral advisor: Thomas Hankins
- Website: www.judithgoodstein.com

Judith Ronnie Goodstein (née Koral, born 1939) is an American historian of science, historian of mathematics, archivist, and book author. She worked for many years at the California Institute of Technology (Caltech), where she is University Archivist Emeritus.

== Education and career ==
Goodstein was born on July 8, 1939, in Brooklyn; both of her parents were college-educated children of Jewish immigrants from eastern Europe, and worked for the city. She went to Erasmus Hall High School in Brooklyn, but left at age 16 to escape its cliquish and competitive atmosphere, and graduated from Brooklyn College in 1960 with a bachelor's degree in history. Her interest in the history of science began at this time, with a graduate-level class she took from Carl Benjamin Boyer, as the only undergraduate in the class. Another faculty mentor at Brooklyn College was John Hope Franklin.

She became a junior high school teacher in Borough Park, Brooklyn before applying with her fiancé, David Goodstein, to graduate schools (she in history, he in physics). On the suggestion of Boyer, she went to the University of Washington, where Harry Woolf was at the time. She was not admitted with financial aid, but Woolf hired her as an assistant. However, he soon moved to another university. She worked with a succession of other professors there, including one who promised to block her graduation because she refused to babysit his children, and successfully defended her Ph.D. in 1968. Her dissertation, Chemical Theory and the Nature of Matter, concerned chemist Humphry Davy, a topic suggested by Satish Kapoor, who also left Washington before she could finish. Her eventual doctoral advisor was Thomas Hankins.

She and her husband moved to Caltech in 1966, where she worked as a teacher again while completing her dissertation, with a year in Rome for her husband's postdoctorate. She was hired as Institute Archivist by Daniel Kevles in 1968, also teaching the history of science at California State University, Dominguez Hills from 1969 to 1973 and later at the University of California, Los Angeles. She became University Archivist in 1995, and retired as University Archivist Emeritus in 2009. She has also worked at Caltech as a faculty associate and lecturer, and was registrar from 1989 to 2003.

== Writing ==
Goodstein is the author of:

- Guide to the Robert Andrews Millikan Collection at the California Institute of Technology (with Albert F. Gunns, American Institute of Physics, 1975)
- The Frank J. Malina Collection at the California Institute of Technology: Guide to a Microfiche Edition (with Carol H. Bugé, California Institute of Technology, 1986)
- Millikan's School: A History of the California Institute of Technology (W.W. Norton, 1991)
- Feynman's Lost Lecture: The Motion of the Planets around the Sun (with David Goodstein, W.W. Norton, 1996)
- The Volterra Chronicles: The Life and Times of an Extraordinary Mathematician, 1860–1940 (American Mathematical Society and London Mathematical Society, 2007)
- Einstein's Italian Mathematicians: Ricci, Levi-Civita, and the Birth of General Relativity (American Mathematical Society, 2018)

She also wrote the screenplays for two episodes of Caltech's television series The Mechanical Universe.

== Personal life ==
Goodstein was married to Caltech physicist David Goodstein. Their son-in-law, Bill T. Gross, is a businessman.
