= Spectrahedron =

Shape that can be represented as a linear matrix inequality

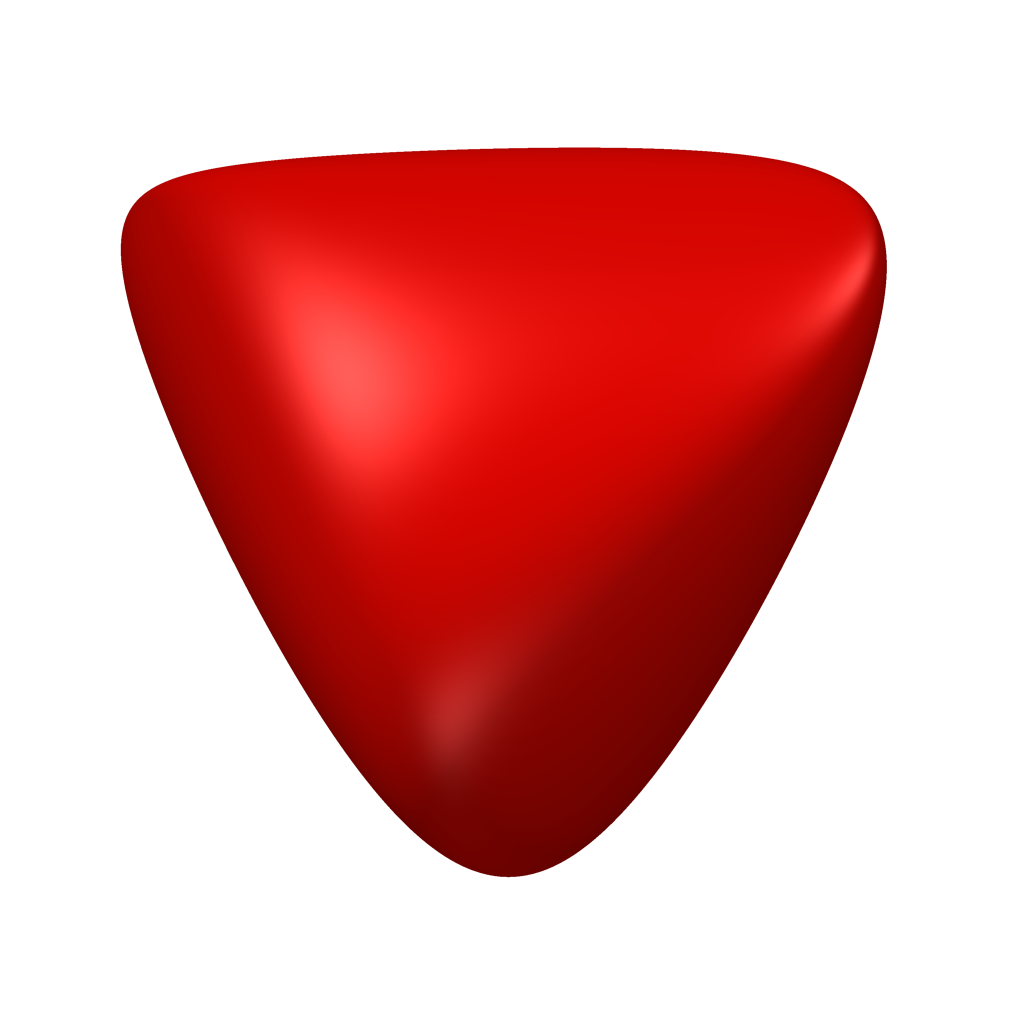
A spectrahedron

In convex geometry, a spectrahedron is a shape that can be represented as a linear matrix inequality. Alternatively, the set of n × n positive semidefinite matrices forms a convex cone in R^{n × n}, and a spectrahedron is a shape that can be formed by intersecting this cone with an affine subspace.

Spectrahedra are the feasible regions of semidefinite programs. The images of spectrahedra under linear or affine transformations are called projected spectrahedra or spectrahedral shadows. Every spectrahedral shadow is a convex set that is also semialgebraic, but the converse (conjectured to be true until 2017) is false.

An example of a spectrahedron is the spectraplex, defined as

$$\mathrm{Spect}_n = \{ X \in \mathbf{S}^n_+ \mid \operatorname{Tr}(X) = 1\}$$,

where $\mathbf{S}^n_+$ is the set of n × n positive semidefinite matrices and $\operatorname{Tr}(X)$ is the trace of the matrix $X$. The spectraplex is a compact set, and can be thought of as the "semidefinite" analog of the simplex.

== See also ==
- N-ellipse - a special case of spectrahedra.
