= David Goodstein =

American physicist (1939–2024)

David L. Goodstein
- Born: David Louis Goodstein; April 5, 1939; New York City, New York, U.S.
- Died: April 10, 2024 (aged 85); Pasadena, California
- Education: Brooklyn College; University of Washington
- Spouse: Judith R. Goodstein
- Relatives: Bill T. Gross (son-in-law)
- Awards: Oersted Medal (1999); John P. McGovern Medal
- Scientific career
- Fields: Physics, applied physics
- Workplaces: California Institute of Technology
- Thesis: The heat capacity of adsorbed helium (1965)
- Doctoral advisor: J. Gregory Dash
- Doctoral students: Roya Maboudian

David Louis Goodstein (April 5, 1939 – April 10, 2024) was an American physicist and educator. From 1988 to 2007 he served as Vice-provost of the California Institute of Technology (Caltech), where he was also a professor of physics and applied physics, as well as (since 1995) the Frank J. Gilloon Distinguished Teaching and Service Professor.

== Life and work ==
David Louis Goodstein was born on April 5, 1939. He was educated at Brooklyn College (BS, 1960) and at the University of Washington (Ph.D., 1965). He wrote several books, including States of Matter (1975) (reprinted in a Dover paperback edition) and Feynman’s Lost Lecture (1996). In the 1980s he was the director and host of The Mechanical Universe, an educational television series on physics that was adapted for high school use and translated into many other languages. The series has been broadcast on hundreds of public broadcasting stations and has garnered more than a dozen prestigious awards, including the 1987 Japan Prize for television.

In his later age, while continuing to teach and conduct research in experimental condensed matter physics, he turned his attention to issues related to science and society. In articles and speeches, he addressed conduct and misconduct in science, and issues related to fossil fuels and the climate of Planet Earth. In 2004 he published a best-selling book Out of Gas: The End of the Age of Oil.

In 1999, Goodstein was awarded the Oersted Medal of the American Association of Physics Teachers, and in 2000, the John P. McGovern Medal of the Sigma Xi Society. He served on and chaired numerous scientific and academic panels, including the National Advisory Committee to the Mathematical and Physical Sciences Directorate of the National Science Foundation. He was a founding member of the board of directors of the California Council on Science and Technology.

In 2015 he published Thermal Physics: Energy and Entropy. Goodstein died in Pasadena, California on April 10, 2024, five days after his 85th birthday.

== Publications ==
=== Books ===
- 1975 States of matter. Englewood Cliffs, N.J.: Prentice-Hall (reissued by Dover Publications, 1985; unabridged and corrected republication, 2014).
- 1985 The mechanical universe: introduction to mechanics and heat (Richard P. Olenick, Tom M. Apostol, David L. Goodstein). New York: Cambridge University Press (1st pbk. ed. 2007).
- 1985 Beyond the mechanical universe: from electricity to modern physics (Richard P. Olenick, Tom M. Apostol, David L. Goodstein). New York: Cambridge University Press (1st pbk. ed. 2007).
- 1986 The Mechanical Universe, Mechanics and Heat, Advanced Edition, textbook (Steven C. Frautschi, Richard P. Olenick, Tom M. Apostol, David L. Goodstein). New York: Cambridge University Press (1st pbk. ed. 2008).
- 1996 Feynman's lost lecture: the motion of planets around the sun (David L. Goodstein and Judith R. Goodstein). New York: Norton.
- 2004 Out of gas: the End of the Age of Oil. New York: Norton.
- 2010 On fact and fraud: cautionary tales from the front lines of science. Princeton, N.J.: Princeton University Press.
- 2011 Adventures in Cosmology (David Goodstein, editor). Singapore: World Scientific Publishing. 2012 reprint
- 2012 Climate Change and the Energy Problem: Physical Science and Economics Perspective (David Goodstein & Michael Intriligator). Singapore: World Scientific Publishing (2nd Edition, 2017).
- 2012 (by Paolo Saraceno). Beyond the stars: our origins and the search for life in the universe (David Goodstein, translator). Singapore; Hackensack, N.J.: World Scientific Publishing.
- 2015 Thermal physics: energy and entropy. Cambridge, UK; New York, NY: Cambridge University Press.
- 2018 Science of the Earth, Climate, and Energy (Milton W. Cole, Angela D. Lueking, David L. Goodstein). New Jersey: World Scientific Publishing.

=== Articles, Book chapters, Reviews ===
- 1989 "Richard P. Feynman, Teacher". Physics Today, 42(2):70–75. doi:10.1063/1.881195.
- 1994 "The Big Crunch". Eos, Transactions American Geophysical Union, 78(32):329,334. doi:10.1029/97EO00213.
- 2000 (with Judith Goodstein). "Richard Feynman and the History of Superconductivity". Physics in Perspective, 2(1):30–47. doi:10.1007/s000160050035.
- 2011 "Quantum Man: Richard Feynman’s Life in Science" (Lawrence M. Krauss). Reviewed by David L. Goodstein. Physics Today, 64(3):55. doi:10.1063/1.3563821.
- 2011 "How Science Works", in: Reference Manual on Scientific Evidence (National Research Council). Washington, DC: The National Academies Press (3rd Edition), pp. 37–54.

== Personal life ==
Goodstein was married to historian of mathematics and science and Caltech archivist Judith R. Goodstein. Their son-in-law, Bill T. Gross, is a businessman.
