= Amplitwist =

Concept used to represent a derivative

In mathematics, the amplitwist is a concept created by Tristan Needham in the book Visual Complex Analysis (1997) to represent the derivative of a complex function visually.

== Definition ==
The amplitwist associated with a given function is its derivative in the complex plane. More formally, it is a complex number $z$ such that in an infinitesimally small neighborhood of a point $a$ in the complex plane, $f(\xi) = z \xi$ for an infinitesimally small vector $\xi$. The complex number $z$ is defined to be the derivative of $f$ at $a$.

== Uses ==
The concept of an amplitwist is used primarily in complex analysis to offer a way of visualizing the derivative of a complex-valued function as a local amplification and twist of vectors at a point in the complex plane.

== Examples ==
Define the function $f(z) = z^3$. Consider the derivative of the function at the point $e^{i\frac{\pi}{4}}$. Since the derivative of $f(z)$ is $3z^2$, we can say that for an infinitesimal vector $\gamma$ at $e^{i\frac{\pi}{4}}$, $f(\gamma)=3(e^{i\frac{\pi}{4}})^2\gamma = 3e^{i\frac{\pi}{2}}\gamma$.
