= N-ellipse =

Generalization of the ellipse to allow more than two foci

Examples of 3-ellipses for three given foci. The progression of the distances is not linear.

In geometry, the n-ellipse is a generalization of the ellipse allowing more than two foci. n-ellipses go by numerous other names, including multifocal ellipse, polyellipse, egglipse, k-ellipse, and Tschirnhaus'sche Eikurve (after Ehrenfried Walther von Tschirnhaus). They were first investigated by James Clerk Maxwell in 1846.

Given n focal points (u_{i}, v_{i}) in a plane, an n-ellipse is the locus of points of the plane whose sum of distances to the n foci is a constant d. In formulas, this is the set

$$\left\{(x, y) \in \mathbf{R}^2: \sum_{i=1}^n \sqrt{(x-u_i)^2 + (y-v_i)^2} = d\right\}.$$

The 1-ellipse is the circle, and the 2-ellipse is the classic ellipse. Both are algebraic curves of degree 2.

For any number n of foci, the n-ellipse is a closed, convex curve. The curve is smooth unless it goes through a focus.

The n-ellipse is in general a subset of the points satisfying a particular algebraic equation. If n is odd, the algebraic degree of the curve is $2^n$, while if n is even the degree is $2^n - \binom{n}{n/2}.$

n-ellipses are special cases of spectrahedra.

== See also ==
- Generalized conic
- Geometric median
