= The Mechanical Universe =

- Genre: Educational
- Created by: David Goodstein
- Starring: David Goodstein
- Narrated by: Aaron Fletcher, Sally Beaty
- Theme music composer: Sharon Smith, Herb Jimmerson
- Country of origin: United States
- Original language: English
- No. of seasons: 1
- No. of episodes: 52

Production
- Executive producer: Sally Beaty
- Producer: Peter Buffa
- Camera setup: Pat Allen
- Running time: 30 minutes
- Production companies: California Institute of Technology; Intelecom

Original release
- Network: PBS
- Release: 1985 – 1986

Related
- Project Mathematics!

The Mechanical Universe...And Beyond is a 52-part telecourse, filmed at the California Institute of Technology, that introduces university level physics, covering topics from Copernicus to quantum mechanics. The 1985-86 series was produced by Caltech and INTELECOM, a nonprofit consortium of California community colleges now known as Intelecom Learning, with financial support from Annenberg/CPB. The series, which aired on PBS affiliate stations before being distributed on LaserDisc and eventually YouTube, is known for its use of computer animation.

== Overview ==
Produced starting in 1982, the videos make heavy use of historical dramatizations and visual aids to explain physics concepts. The latter were state of the art at the time, incorporating almost eight hours of computer animation created by computer graphics pioneer Jim Blinn along with assistants Sylvie Rueff and Tom Brown at the Jet Propulsion Laboratory. Each episode opens and closes with bookend segments in which Caltech professor David Goodstein, speaking in a lecture hall, delivers explanations "that can't quite be put into the mouth of our affable, faceless narrator". After more than a quarter century, the series is still often used as a supplemental teaching aid, for its clear explanation of fundamental concepts such as special relativity.

The bookend segments featuring Goodstein were specially staged versions of actual freshman physics lectures from Caltech's courses Physics 1a and 1b. The organization and the choice of topics to emphasize in the television show reflect a then-recent revision of Caltech's introductory physics curriculum, the first total overhaul since the one represented by The Feynman Lectures on Physics almost two decades earlier. While Feynman generally sought contemporary examples of topics, the later revision of the curriculum brought a more historical focus:

In essence, the earlier Feynman course had sought to make physics exciting by relating each subject, wherever possible, to contemporary scientific problems. The new course took the opposite tack, of trying to recreate the historical excitement of the original discovery. For example, classical mechanics—a notoriously difficult and uninspiring subject for students—is treated as the discovery of "our place in the universe". Accordingly, celestial mechanics is the backbone of the subject and its climax is Newton's solution of the Kepler problem.

Episode 22 solved the Kepler problem — that is, demonstrating that an inverse-square law of gravity implies that orbits are conic sections — using a variant of the Laplace–Runge–Lenz vector, though not by that name.

== Production details ==
The room seen in the bookend segments is the Bridge lecture hall at Caltech. Many of the extras were students from other schools, and the front rows of the lecture hall were deliberately filled with more women than would have typically been seen at Caltech lectures. The TV production team added fake wood paneling to the lecture hall so that it would more closely resemble that seen in the show The Paper Chase. Later, the Caltech physics department was sufficiently impressed by the result that panels were installed permanently. Many seats in the lecture hall had to be removed in order to make room for the camera track and studio lights. To cover this, additional reaction shots of a full lecture hall were filmed later, so that the illusion of a complete audience could be created in editing. For most of the footage of Goodstein himself, only two rows of students were present.

Many other video segments were shot on location, for example at a Linde industrial plant that produced liquid air. Historical scenes were often made to be generic, in order to facilitate their reuse across multiple episodes: "Young Newton strolls through an apple orchard, old Newton testily refuses a cup of tea from a servant, and so on". Footage featuring historical reenactment of Johannes Kepler was purchased from Carl Sagan's 1980 television series Cosmos: A Personal Voyage.

The series was originally planned to consist of 26 episodes. This was later expanded to 60 episodes, a number then cut back to the eventual total of 52 for budget and production-schedule reasons.

The show was intended not to require previous experience with calculus. Instead, the basics of differential and integral calculus would both be taught early in the series itself. Caltech mathematician Tom M. Apostol joined the Mechanical Universe production staff in order to ensure that the series did not compromise on the quality of the mathematics it presented. Seeing an example of Blinn's computer animation for the first time convinced Apostol that the series could bring mathematics "to life in a way that cannot be done in a textbook or at the chalkboard". When test screenings to humanities students revealed that their greatest difficulty learning calculus was a weak background in trigonometry, Apostol wrote a primer on the subject to be distributed with the telecourse. After advising the production of The Mechanical Universe, Apostol decided that a similar series, geared to high-school mathematics, would be beneficial. This became the later Caltech series Project Mathematics!, which also featured computer animation by Blinn. Some of Blinn's animations for The Mechanical Universe were reused in the new series, in order to illustrate applications of algebra, geometry, and trigonometry.

The 1990 science-fiction action film Total Recall used portions of the Mechanical Universe title sequence, in a scene where the protagonist (Douglas Quaid, played by Arnold Schwarzenegger) is offered virtual vacations in locales around the Solar System. The animation was used without licensing, and consequently, Caltech and Intelecom sued Carolco Pictures for $3 million.

In order to present detailed mathematical equation derivations, the show employed a technique its creators called the "algebraic ballet". Computer animation presented derivations in step-by-step detail, but rapidly and with touches of whimsy, such as algebraic terms being canceled by a Monty Python-esque stomping foot or the hand of God from Michelangelo's The Creation of Adam. Blinn felt that Cosmos had taken itself "too seriously", and so he aimed to include more humor in the Mechanical Universe animations. The goal was to avoid putting the viewers' "brains into a 60-cycle hum", without sacrificing rigor; the creators intended that students could learn the overall gist of each derivation from the animation, and then study the details using the accompanying textbook. Computer animation was also used to portray idealizations of physical systems, like simulated billiard balls illustrating Newton's laws of motion. Blinn had used some of the same software earlier to visualize the interaction of DNA and DNA polymerase for Cosmos. One commenter deemed these animations "particularly useful in providing students with subjective insights into dynamic three-dimensional phenomena such as magnetic fields".

Creating the computer graphics necessary to visualize physics concepts led Blinn to invent new techniques for simulating clouds, as well as the virtual "blobby objects" known as metaballs. Blinn used the vertex coordinates of regular icosahedra and dodecahedra to determine the placement of electric field lines radiating away from point charges.

Most of the narration was voiced by actor Aaron Fletcher, who also played Galileo Galilei in the historical segments. Some portions, such as explanations of particular technical details, were narrated by Sally Beaty, the show's executive producer.

Shorter versions of Mechanical Universe episodes, 10 to 20 minutes in length, were created for use in high schools. This adaptation, for which a dozen high-school teachers and administrators were consultants, was supported by a $650,000 grant from the National Science Foundation. These videos were distributed alongside supplemental written material for teachers' benefit, and were intended to be employed in conjunction with existing textbooks. Yorkshire Television later produced a version repackaged for the United Kingdom audience, which was released in April 1991.

== Funding ==
Annenberg/CPB provided the funding for the production of The Mechanical Universe. The show was one of the first twelve projects funded by the initial $90 million pledge the Annenberg Foundation gave to the Corporation for Public Broadcasting in the early 1980s. The total cost of the project was roughly $10 million.

== Critical reception ==
=== Initial responses ===
PBS and The Learning Channel began broadcasting The Mechanical Universe in September 1985. During the fall of 1986, roughly 100 PBS stations carried The Mechanical Universe, and by the fall of 1987, over 600 higher-education institutions had purchased it or licensed the episodes for use. In 1992, Goodstein noted that the series had been broadcast, via PBS, by over 100 stations, "usually at peculiar hours when innocent people were unlikely to tune in accidentally on a differential equation in the act of being solved". He observed that detailed viewership figures were difficult to obtain, but when the show had been broadcast in Miami during Saturday mornings, the producers were able to obtain Nielsen ratings.

In fact, it came in second in its time slot, beating the kiddie cartoons on two network stations. There were 18,000 faithful core households in Dade County alone, the median age of the viewers was 18, and half were female. However, we seldom get that kind of detailed information.

Goodstein and assistant project director Richard Olenick noted:

Anecdotal information in the form of letters and phone calls indicates very considerable enthusiasm among users at all levels from casual viewers to high-school students to research university professors, but there have also been a number of sharp disappointments, particularly when Instructional Television administrators have tried to handle TMU like a conventional telecourse.

Similarly, a 1988 review in Physics Today suggested that the programs would not function well on their own as a telecourse, but would work much better as a supplement to a traditional classroom or a more standard distance-learning course such as Open University. The reviewers also found the "algebraic ballet" of computer-animated equations too fast to follow: "After a short time, one yearns for a live professor filling the blackboard with equations". Similarly, a review in the American Journal of Physics, while praising the "technical proficiency of the films", wrote of the animated equation manipulations: "As the MIT students say, this is like trying to take a drink of water out of a fire hose". A considerably more enthusiastic evaluation came from physicist Charles H. Holbrow, who told Olenick: "These materials will constitute the principal visual image of physics for decades". A reviewer writing for Educational Technology found the animations "fascinating to watch" and opined that they were at least as effective as what many instructors could manage at a traditional blackboard. An editorial in the Los Angeles Times called the show "extraordinary" and the animations "splendid", quipping that "if differential calculus is not television's Supreme Test, it would certainly make the semifinals in any competition". Goodstein and Olenick reported that younger viewers tended to enjoy the "algebraic ballet" style "much more than older viewers, who are made uncomfortable by the algebraic manipulations they cannot quite follow".

=== Classroom use ===
In 1986, The Mechanical Universe was used as part of a summer program for gifted children, to overall success.

A 1987 study at Indiana University Bloomington used 14 Mechanical Universe episodes as part of an introductory course on Newtonian mechanics, with generally positive results:

[T]hese tapes were particularly effective in placing Newtonian mechanics in a historical perspective; dramatizing the historical overthrow of Aristotelian and medieval ideas; illustrating the diverse nature of scientists and the scientific endeavor; stimulating student interest and enthusiasm; and, through excellent animation, illustrating the time dimension of certain mechanics concepts. The companion text [...] was placed on library reserve for the course but was not extensively utilized by students.

A follow-up study found that the videos could also be helpful explaining physics to professors in other fields. Negative reactions generally had less to do with the intrinsic perceived quality of the episodes than with the time the science-history material took away from content seen as "critical exam-preparing instruction". The investigator recalled:

[S]ome students, thinking that the videotape material would not be covered on the tests, headed for the doors when the lights dimmed! To counter this tendency I started to use a few test questions based on historical or literary details discussed in the videotapes. Some students were outraged: "What is this, a poetry class?"

Classroom use continued into the 1990s. A minority education program at the University of California, Berkeley employed Mechanical Universe episode segments (on LaserDisc) as part of group discussions. In a 1993 review of the series, a science historian stated that he had used episodes in his classes for several years, naming "Kepler's Three Laws" and "The Michelson–Morley Experiment" as his personal favorites.

The highlight of the Kepler film is a segment in which we are shown an exquisite graphical realization of the way in which Kepler actually figured out that the orbits of the planets are elliptical rather than circular. The sheer difficulty of the problem he faced and the elegance of the method he applied to solve it are abundantly clear. I cannot imagine a better way to present this magnificent discovery, which can easily appear so trivial.

A 2005 column in The Physics Teacher suggested The Mechanical Universe as preparatory viewing for instructors attempting to teach physics for the first time. The Physics Teacher has also recommended the series "as enrichment or a makeup assignment for high-ability students". Writing for Wired magazine's web site, Rhett Allain cited the series as an example of videos that could replace some functions of traditional lectures.

== Awards ==
In 1987, "The Lorentz Transformation" (episode 42) was awarded the sixteenth annual Japan Prize for educational television. Other awards received by The Mechanical Universe include the 1986 Gold Award from the Birmingham International Film Festival, two "Cindy" awards from the International Association of Audio Visual Communicators (1987 and 1988), a Gold Award (1985) and a Silver Award (1987) from the International Film and TV Festival of New York, Silver (1986) and Gold Apple (1987) awards from the National Educational Film and Video Festival, and a Gold Plaque (1985) from the Chicago International Film Festival.

Goodstein received the 1999 Oersted Medal for his work in physics education, including The Mechanical Universe. For his contributions to the field of computer graphics, including his animations for Cosmos, The Mechanical Universe and Project Mathematics!, Blinn received a MacArthur fellowship in 1991, as well as the 1999 Steven A. Coons Award.

== Portrayal of Tacoma Narrows Bridge collapse ==
Like many introductory physics texts, The Mechanical Universe cites the spectacular 1940 collapse of the Tacoma Narrows Bridge as an example of resonance, using footage of the disaster in the "Resonance" episode. However, as more-recent expositions have emphasized, the catastrophic oscillations that destroyed the bridge were not due to simple mechanical resonance, but to a more complicated interaction between the bridge and the winds passing through it—a phenomenon known as aeroelastic flutter. This phenomenon is a kind of "self-sustaining vibration" that lies beyond the regime of applicability of the linear theory of the externally-driven simple harmonic oscillator.

== List of episodes ==
The opening sequence used for the first 26 episodes lists the show's title as The Mechanical Universe, whereas the latter 26 episodes are titled The Mechanical Universe ...and Beyond. The reason for the addition is explained by Goodstein in the closing lecture segment of the final episode:

In the first scientific revolution, disputation over the interpretation of human or divine authority was replaced by observation, by measurement, by the testing of hypotheses, all of it with the powerful help of quantitative mathematical reasoning. And the result of all that was the mechanical universe, a universe that inexorably worked out its destiny according to precise, predictable, mechanical laws. Today, we no longer believe in that universe. If I know the precise position of some particle at some instant of time, I cannot have any idea of where it's going or how fast. And it doesn't make any difference at all if you say, "All right, you don't know where it's going, but where is it really going?" That is precisely the kind of question that is scientifically meaningless. That is the nature of the world we live in. That is the quantum mechanical universe.

The series can be purchased from Caltech or streamed from online video sources, including Caltech's official YouTube channel. Caltech also posted on YouTube a series of short videos made by Blinn to demonstrate the show's computer animation at SIGGRAPH conferences.

=== The Mechanical Universe ===
No.	Title	Directed by	Written by	YouTube link
1	"Introduction"	Peter F. Buffa	Jack Arnold	1
Brief overview of the material in the first 26 episodes.
2	"The Law of Falling Bodies"	Peter F. Buffa	Peter F. Buffa	2
How falling bodies behave and an introduction to the derivative.
3	"Derivatives"	Mark Rothschild	Pamela Kleibrink	3
Review of the mathematical operation the derivative.
4	"Inertia"	Peter F. Buffa	Albert Abrams	4
How Galileo used the law of inertia to answer questions about the stars.
5	"Vectors"	Peter F. Buffa	Deane Rink	5
Vectors not only have a magnitude but also a direction.
6	"Newton's Laws"	Mark Rothschild	Ronald J. Casden	6
Newton's first, second and third laws.
7	"Integration"	Mark Rothschild	Seth Hill & Tom M. Apostol	7
Integration and differentiation are inverse operations of each other.
8	"The Apple and the Moon"	Peter F. Buffa	Don Bane	8
An apple falls and the Moon orbits the Earth because of gravity.
9	"Moving in Circles"	Mark Rothschild	Deane Rink	9
A body in uniform circular motion has both constant speed and constant acceleration.
10	"Fundamental Forces"	Mark Rothschild	Don Bane	10
Gravity, electromagnetism, and the strong and weak nuclear forces.
11	"Gravity, Electricity, Magnetism"	Peter F. Buffa	Don Bane	11
How electricity and magnetism relate to the speed of light.
12	"The Millikan Experiment"	Mark Rothschild	Albert Abrams	12
Millikan's demonstration to accurately measure the charge of an electron.
13	"Conservation of Energy"	Mark Rothschild	Seth Hill	13
Energy cannot be created or destroyed, only transformed.
14	"Potential Energy"	Mark Rothschild	Don Bane	14
Systems that are stable are at their lowest potential energy.
15	"Conservation of Momentum"	Peter Robinson	Jack George Arnold	15
Momentum is conserved when two or more bodies interact.
16	"Harmonic Motion"	Mark Rothschild	Ronald J. Casden	16
Disturbing stable systems will produce simple harmonic motion.
17	"Resonance"	Peter F. Buffa	Ronald J. Casden	17
Resonance is produced when the frequency of a disturbing force comes close to the natural harmonic frequency of a system.
18	"Waves"	Peter F. Buffa	Ronald J. Casden	18
Waves are a series of disturbances that propagate through solids, liquids and gases.
19	"Angular Momentum"	Peter F. Buffa	Jack George Arnold & David L. Goodstein	19
Objects traveling in circles have angular momentum.
20	"Torques and Gyroscopes"	Mark Rothschild	Jack George Arnold & David L. Goodstein	20
A force acting on a spinning object can cause it to precess.
21	"Kepler's Three Laws"	Peter F. Buffa	Seth Hill	21
Kepler discovered the orbits of the planets are ellipses.
22	"The Kepler Problem"	Peter F. Buffa	Seth Hill	22
Newton proved that an inverse-square law of gravity implies that celestial bodies move in orbits that are conic sections.
23	"Energy and Eccentricity"	Peter F. Buffa	Seth Hill	23
The conservation of energy and angular momentum help determine how eccentric an orbit will be.
24	"Navigating in Space"	Peter F. Buffa	Don Bane	24
The laws that describe planetary motion are used to navigate in space.
25	"Kepler to Einstein"	Peter F. Buffa	Don Bane, David L. Goodstein & Jack George Arnold	25
Albert Einstein used Newton's and Kepler's laws to work on his theory of relativity.
26	"Harmony of the Spheres"	Peter F. Buffa	David L. Goodstein & Jack George Arnold	26
A review of the series up to this point, with the "music of the spheres" as its organizing theme. Features a synthesizer composition by John Rodgers and Willie Ruff.

=== The Mechanical Universe ...and Beyond ===
No.	Title	Directed by	Written by	YouTube link
27	"Beyond the Mechanical Universe"	uncredited	Jack Arnold	27
An overview of the subject matter for the latter half of the series.
28	"Static Electricity"	Mark Rothschild	Donald Button	28
Introducing the concept of electric charge.
29	"The Electric Field"	uncredited	Don Button, Jack Arnold	29
Michael Faraday gave science the image of the electric field.
30	"Capacitance and Potential"	uncredited	Graham Berry, Jack Arnold	30
The basics of the capacitor, with a historical emphasis on Benjamin Franklin.
31	"Voltage, Energy, and Force"	Mark Rothschild	Donald Button	31
Furthering the understanding of how electric charges exert forces and do work.
32	"The Electric Battery"	uncredited	Judith R. Goodstein	32
Thanks to Alessandro Volta's invention of the electric battery, we can have steady electrical current.
33	"Electric Circuits"	Mark Rothschild	Donald Button	33
The "nuts and bolts" of how electrical circuitry was made practical, featuring Wheatstone, Kirchhoff and Ohm.
34	"Magnetism"	uncredited	Donald Button, Jack Arnold	34
William Gilbert found that the Earth itself is a magnet, a discovery built upon by modern science.
35	"The Magnetic Field"	Mark Rothschild	Jack Arnold	35
Electric currents create, and are influenced by, magnetic fields, per the Biot–Savart and Ampère laws.
36	"Vector Fields and Hydrodynamics"	Robert Lattanzio	Donald Button, Jack Arnold	36
Some concepts apply generally to all vector fields and are useful both in electromagnetism and in the study of fluid flow.
37	"Electromagnetic Induction"	uncredited	Jack Arnold	37
A changing magnetic field creates an electric current: electromagnetic induction, demonstrated by Faraday in 1831.
38	"Alternating Currents"	Mark Rothschild	Jack Arnold	38
In order to make the distribution of electric power practical over great distances, transformers are used to change the voltages of alternating currents.
39	"Maxwell's Equations"	Mark Rothschild	Jack Arnold	39
By finding the missing conceptual piece in the mathematics of electricity and magnetism, Maxwell discovers light is an electromagnetic wave.
40	"Optics"	Robert Lattanzio	Jack Arnold, David Goodstein	40
Understanding light as a wave makes sense of reflection, refraction, and diffraction.
41	"The Michelson–Morley experiment"	uncredited	Don Bane	41
If light is a wave, what is waving? By careful and precise measurement, Michelson and Morley tried to detect the Earth's motion through this medium, the "luminiferous aether", and found nothing.
42	"The Lorentz Transformation"	uncredited	Don Button	42
Einstein realized that, if the speed of light is to be the same for all observers, then distances in space and durations of elapsed time must be relative.
43	"Velocity and Time"	uncredited	Jack Arnold, Richard Bellikoff	43
Einstein arrived at the Lorentz transformation from a deeper conceptual understanding, creating a theory full of surprises like the twin paradox.
44	"Energy, Momentum, and Mass"	uncredited	Jack Arnold	44
The conservation of momentum still applies in special relativity, but with new implications.
45	"Temperature and the Gas Law"	uncredited	Jack Arnold	45
The study of thermodynamics begins with gases.
46	"The Engine of Nature"	Mark Rothschild	Graham Berry, David Goodstein	46
An introduction to the Carnot engine, an idealized machine for converting thermal energy into mechanical work.
47	"Entropy"	uncredited	David Goodstein, Jack Arnold	47
Further investigation of Carnot engines leads to the concept of entropy.
48	"Low Temperatures"	uncredited	Judith R. Goodstein	48
Faraday makes chlorine gas into a liquid, kicking off the pursuit of lower and lower temperatures, culminating in the liquification of helium.
49	"The Atom"	uncredited	David Goodstein, Jack Arnold	49
The ancient Greeks introduced the notion that matter is made of atoms. In the early 20th century, spectral lines and the discovery of the atomic nucleus forced the development of new ideas.
50	"Particles and Waves"	uncredited	Donald Button	50
Light, which had been thought to be a wave, was found to act in some circumstances like a stream of particles. This puzzle led to quantum mechanics.
51	"Atoms to Quarks"	uncredited	Donald Button	51
Understanding the wavefunctions that can be assigned to the electron in a hydrogen atom illuminates the shape of the periodic table of the elements.
52	"The Quantum Mechanical Universe"	uncredited	David Goodstein	52
A review of the series.

== Companion textbooks ==
- R.P. Olenick, T.M. Apostol, and D.L. Goodstein (1986). The Mechanical Universe: Introduction to Mechanics and Heat (Cambridge University Press). ISBN 0-521-30429-6
- R.P. Olenick, T.M. Apostol, and D.L. Goodstein (1986). Beyond the Mechanical Universe: From Electricity to Modern Physics (Cambridge University Press). ISBN 0-521-30430-X
