= Out of Gas: The End of the Age of Oil =

2004 book written by David Goodstein

- Paperback edition cover
- Author: David Goodstein
- Language: English
- Subject: Peak oil
- Genre: Science
- Publisher: W. W. Norton & Company
- Publication date: February 2, 2004
- Publication place: United States
- Media type: Print (Hardcover & Paperback)
- Pages: 144
- ISBN: 0-393-05857-3
- Dewey Decimal: 622/.1828 21
- LC Class: TN870 .G645 2004

Out of Gas: The End of the Age of Oil is a 2004 book written by David Goodstein. It describes peak oil and the future of civilization.

== Synopsis ==
The book gives the scientific view that the age of petroleum is coming to an end, and the energy future is dangerously insecure. Oil demand will shortly exceed the production capacity of even the largest suppliers. The book describes how the world economy is moving towards an uneasy transition. In this book, Goodstein rejected the notion that after peak occurs new alternative sources of energy will be able to fuel industry at the same level. Evidence for imminent decrease in world oil production and consequential economic impact and the viability of alternative sources of energy have been presented in the book.

The book begins by citing the work of M. King Hubbert. Then Goodstein briefly mentions thermodynamics, electromagnetism and geology. He then describes the alternative energy technologies. He opines that the alternative energy technologies will not be effective because of the time it will take to improve them for continuing the present day industry. According to the book, the age of oil is ending. Oil supply will shortly begin to decline, precipitating a global crisis. Even if coal and natural gas are substituted for some of the oil, human civilization will start to run out of fossil fuels by the end of the 21st century. He concludes with the warning: "Civilization as we know it will come to an end sometime in this century unless we can find a way to live without fossil fuels".

== Reviews ==
Paul Raeburn wrote in The New York Times that Goodstein's prediction regarding peak oil and future of civilization is based on an understanding of physics and thermodynamics, and on a simple observation about natural resources. He described Out of Gas: The End of the Age of Oil in The New York Times as "a book that is more powerful for being brief -- takes a detour to explain some of the basics of energy budgets, thermodynamics and entropy, and it does so with the clarity and gentle touch of a master teacher". Raeburn concluded about Goodstein's book:

I hope Goodstein is wrong. I wish we could dismiss him as an addled environmentalist, too much in love with his windmill to know which way the wind is blowing. On the strength of the evidence, and his argument, however, we can't. If he's right, I'm sorry for my kids. And I'm especially sorry for theirs.

Publishers Weekly commented on the book:

In this alarming little book, portions of which were originally published in a bioethics journal, Goodstein explains with limited jargon that we will completely exhaust oil supplies within 10 years. He warns that we have reached, or even surpassed Hubbert's Peak, the moment when we have consumed half of all oil known to exist and will likely use the rest up even faster, due to ever-increasing demand and decreasing discoveries. What will we do when all the oil is gone? Goodstein outlines two scenarios, both chilling. In the worst case, we might run out of oil so fast that the only affordable alternative is coal. In this throwback future, Goodstein writes, "the greenhouse effect that results eventually tips Earth's climate into a new state hostile to life." The best case scenario involves a methane-based fuel economy that would bridge the gap until we could build up nuclear and solar power sources to meet our long-term needs. Goodstein admits that some geologists disagree that we will deplete all oil sources within this decade, but even conservative calculations predict the price of oil will increase beyond the reach of most people within the foreseeable future. "No matter what else happens," Goodstein states, "this is the century in which we must learn to live without fossil fuels." He maintains a cautious optimism about alternative energy sources, but readers may find little comfort imagining nuclear fission energy as the next best thing.

Brian Braiker described the book in Newsweek as an "important one" where Goodstein gives the explanation of the science behind his prediction.
