= Calculus (Apostol books) =

Series of two mathematics textbooks

Calculus is a two-volume textbook series by mathematician Tom M. Apostol.

== History ==
Apostol wrote the two-volume Calculus set because there was no existing textbook suitable for the students entering Caltech in the late 1950s. Over the course of a year, the mathematics faculty debated how to restructure their introductory classes, eventually developing a revised plan that would coordinate with the physics classes being taught at the same time. Having already published one book (Mathematical Analysis in 1957), Apostol found himself "eager" to write the lecture notes. Originally distributed as mimeographed booklets, these notes became the Calculus volumes. Students at Caltech referred to them as "Tommy 1" and "Tommy 2".

The first volume, on single-variable integral and differential calculus, was the first book printed by the Blaisdell Publishing Company, a publisher in Waltham, Massachusetts, acquired by Ginn and Company in 1963.

Volume 1 was published in 1961, and volume 2 the year after. A second edition of Volume 1 was published in 1967, incorporating two new chapters on linear algebra. Volume 2 received a second edition in 1969.

== Contents ==
The first volume covers integration before teaching differentiation, swapping the typical order in which the subjects are presented. After introducing the integrals and derivatives, the two basic operations of calculus, it covers elementary transcendental functions, the basics of differential equations, and other topics including analytic geometry, infinite series and the mathematics of planetary orbits.

Volume 2 covers multivariable calculus, including topics in vector calculus like Green's theorem and Stokes' theorem, as well as linear differential equations and the theory of probability.

== Reception ==
F. Cunningham Jr., reviewing the first volume for The American Mathematical Monthly, praised the quality of its exposition and the exercises that Apostol included. Cunningham wrote that he himself "would favor even more emphasis on applications, and a lighter touch on some questions of rigor". Of the second volume, he declared that it "if anything surpasses the first in excellence of workmanship, and occasions for detailed criticism are not worth mentioning".

In The Mathematical Gazette, R. L. Goodstein called the first volume "beautifully produced". He offered what he considered minor criticisms, like the "old-fashioned" way in which the book treated partial fractions.

E. D. Bolker called the second edition an improvement upon the first, describing it as "easier to use in the classroom and no less stimulating". Bolker considered it suitable for an advanced first-year university course, and declared, "All instructors should own a copy to use as a reference work."

Both volumes have been deemed "essential for undergraduate mathematics libraries" by the Mathematical Association of America.

== Editions ==
- Apostol, Tom M. (1961). Calculus, Volume 1: Introduction, with vectors and analytic geometry (1st ed.). Blaisdell.
- Apostol, Tom M. (1962). Calculus, Volume 2: Calculus of several variables with applications to probability and vector analysis (1st ed.). Blaisdell.
- Apostol, Tom M. (1967). Calculus, Volume 1: One-variable calculus, with an introduction to linear algebra (2nd ed.). Wiley. ISBN 0-536-00005-0. MR 0214705. Zbl 0148.28201.
- Apostol, Tom M. (1969). Calculus, Volume 2: Multi-variable calculus and linear algebra with applications to differential equations and probability (2nd ed.). Wiley. ISBN 0-471-00008-6.
