= Focus (geometry) =

Geometric point from which certain types of curves are constructed

Point F is a focus point for the red ellipse, green parabola and blue hyperbola.

In geometry, focuses or foci (/ˈfoʊsaɪ/ or /ˈfoʊkaɪ/; sg.: focus) are special points with reference to which any of a variety of curves is constructed. For example, one or two foci can be used in defining conic sections, the four types of which are the circle, ellipse, parabola, and hyperbola. In addition, two foci are used to define the Cassini oval and the Cartesian oval, and more than two foci are used in defining an n-ellipse.

== Conic sections ==
=== Defining conics in terms of two foci ===
The foci of an ellipse (purple crosses) are at intersects of the major axis (red) and a circle (cyan) of radius equal to the semi-major axis (blue), centred on an end of the minor axis (grey)

An ellipse can be defined as the locus of points for which the sum of the distances to two given foci is constant.

A circle is the special case of an ellipse in which the two foci coincide with each other. Thus, a circle can be more simply defined as the locus of points each of which is a fixed distance from a single given focus. A circle can also be defined as the circle of Apollonius, in terms of two different foci, as the locus of points having a fixed ratio of distances to the two foci.

A parabola is a limiting case of an ellipse in which one of the foci is a point at infinity.

A hyperbola can be defined as the locus of points for which the absolute value of the difference between the distances to two given foci is constant.

=== Defining conics in terms of a focus and a directrix ===
It is also possible to describe all conic sections in terms of a single focus and a single directrix, which is a given line not containing the focus. A conic is defined as the locus of points for each of which the distance to the focus divided by the distance to the directrix is a fixed positive constant, called the eccentricity e. If 0 < e < 1 the conic is an ellipse, if e = 1 the conic is a parabola, and if e > 1 the conic is a hyperbola. If the distance to the focus is fixed and the directrix is a line at infinity, so the eccentricity is zero, then the conic is a circle.

=== Defining conics in terms of a focus and a directrix circle ===
It is also possible to describe all the conic sections as loci of points that are equidistant from a single focus and a single, circular directrix. For the ellipse, both the focus and the center of the directrix circle have finite coordinates and the radius of the directrix circle is greater than the distance between the center of this circle and the focus; thus, the focus is inside the directrix circle. The ellipse thus generated has its second focus at the center of the directrix circle, and the ellipse lies entirely within the circle.

For the parabola, the center of the directrix moves to the point at infinity (see Projective geometry). The directrix "circle" becomes a curve with zero curvature, indistinguishable from a straight line. The two arms of the parabola become increasingly parallel as they extend, and "at infinity" become parallel; using the principles of projective geometry, the two parallels intersect at the point at infinity and the parabola becomes a closed curve (elliptical projection).

To generate a hyperbola, the radius of the directrix circle is chosen to be less than the distance between the center of this circle and the focus; thus, the focus is outside the directrix circle. The arms of the hyperbola approach asymptotic lines and the "right-hand" arm of one branch of a hyperbola meets the "left-hand" arm of the other branch of a hyperbola at the point at infinity; this is based on the principle that, in projective geometry, a single line meets itself at a point at infinity. The two branches of a hyperbola are thus the two (twisted) halves of a curve closed over infinity.

In projective geometry, all conics are equivalent in the sense that every theorem that can be stated for one can be stated for the others.

=== Astronomical significance ===
In the gravitational two-body problem, the orbits of the two bodies about each other are described by two overlapping conic sections with one of the foci of one being coincident with one of the foci of the other at the center of mass (barycenter) of the two bodies.

Thus, for instance, the minor planet Pluto's largest moon Charon has an elliptical orbit which has one focus at the Pluto-Charon system's barycenter, which is a point that is in space between the two bodies; and Pluto also moves in an ellipse with one of its foci at that same barycenter between the bodies. Pluto's ellipse is entirely inside Charon's ellipse, as shown in this animation of the system.

By comparison, the Earth's Moon moves in an ellipse with one of its foci at the barycenter of the Moon and the Earth, this barycenter being within the Earth itself, while the Earth (more precisely, its center) moves in an ellipse with one focus at that same barycenter within the Earth. The barycenter is about three-quarters of the distance from Earth's center to its surface.

Moreover, the Pluto-Charon system moves in an ellipse around its barycenter with the Sun, as does the Earth-Moon system (and every other planet-moon system or moonless planet in the Solar System). In both cases the barycenter is well within the body of the Sun.

Two binary stars also move in ellipses sharing a focus at their barycenter; for an animation, see here.

== Cartesian and Cassini ovals ==
A Cartesian oval is the set of points for each of which the weighted sum of the distances to two given foci is constant. If the weights are equal, the special case of an ellipse results.

A Cassini oval is the set of points for each of which the product of the distances to two given foci is constant.

== Generalizations ==
An n-ellipse is the set of points all having the same sum of distances to n foci (the n = 2 case being the conventional ellipse).

The concept of a focus can be generalized to arbitrary algebraic curves. Let C be a curve of class m and let I and J denote the circular points at infinity. Draw the m tangents to C through each of I and J. There are two sets of m lines which will have m^{2} points of intersection, with exceptions in some cases due to singularities, etc. These points of intersection are the defined to be the foci of C. In other words, a point P is a focus if both PI and PJ are tangent to C. When C is a real curve, only the intersections of conjugate pairs are real, so there are m in a real foci and m^{2} − m imaginary foci. When C is a conic, the real foci defined this way are exactly the foci which can be used in the geometric construction of C.

== Confocal curves ==
Let P_{1}, P_{2}, …, P_{m} be given as foci of a curve C of class m. Let P be the product of the tangential equations of these points and Q the product of the tangential equations of the circular points at infinity. Then all the lines which are common tangents to both P = 0 and Q = 0 are tangent to C. So, by the AF+BG theorem, the tangential equation of C has the form HP + KQ = 0. Since C has class m, H must be a constant and K but have degree less than or equal to m − 2. The case H = 0 can be eliminated as degenerate, so the tangential equation of C can be written as P + fQ = 0 where f is an arbitrary polynomial of degree 2m.

For example, let m = 2, P_{1} = (1, 0), and P_{2} = (−1, 0). The tangential equations are

$$\begin{align}
X + 1 &= 0 \\
X - 1 &= 0
\end{align}$$

so P = X^{2} − 1 = 0. The tangential equations for the circular points at infinity are

$$\begin{align}
X + iY &= 0 \\
X - iY &= 0
\end{align}$$

so Q = X^{2} +Y^{2}. Therefore, the tangential equation for a conic with the given foci is

$$X^2 - 1 + c(X^2 +Y^2) = 0$$

or

$$(1+c)X^2 + cY^2 = 1,$$

where c is an arbitrary constant. In point coordinates this becomes

$$\frac{x^2}{1+c} + \frac{y^2}{c} = 1.$$
