= Mamikon Mnatsakanian =

Armenian physicist (1942–2021)

Mamikon A. Mnatsakanian
- Մամիկոն Մնացականյան
- Born: 17 April 1942; Yerevan, Armenian SSR, Soviet Union
- Died: 12 April 2021 (aged 78); Yerevan, Armenia
- Education: Yerevan State University Ph.D.
- Occupation: physicist
- Known for: visual calculus
- Notable work: new proof of the Pythagorean theorem

Mamikon A. Mnatsakanian (17 April 1942 – 12 April 2021) (Armenian: Մամիկոն Մնացականյան) was an Armenian physicist. In 1959, he discovered a new proof of the Pythagorean theorem.

He received a Ph.D. in physics in 1969 from Yerevan State University, where he became professor of astrophysics. As an undergraduate he specialized in the development of geometric methods for solving calculus problems by a visual approach that makes no use of formulas, which he later developed into his system of visual calculus.

He was a Project Associate at Project Mathematics! at the California Institute of Technology.

With co-author Tom Apostol, he won the Paul R. Halmos – Lester R. Ford Award given by the Mathematical Association of America for author excellence, in 2005, 2008, and 2010.

When Apostol met Mamikon he wrote, "As a teacher of calculus for more than 50 years and as an author of a couple of textbooks on the subject, I was stunned to learn that many standard problems in calculus can be easily solved by an innovative visual approach that makes no use of formulas."

In 2010, he was nominated by Caltech for the Ambartsumians International Prize, awarded annually by the President of Armenia, for his contributions in the field of theoretical astrophysics.

The book, New Horizons in Geometry, was the result of 15 years of collaboration between Tom Apostol and Mamikon.

== See also ==
- Generalized conic
- Visual calculus
