= Bill T. Gross =

American businessman (born 1958)

Bill Gross
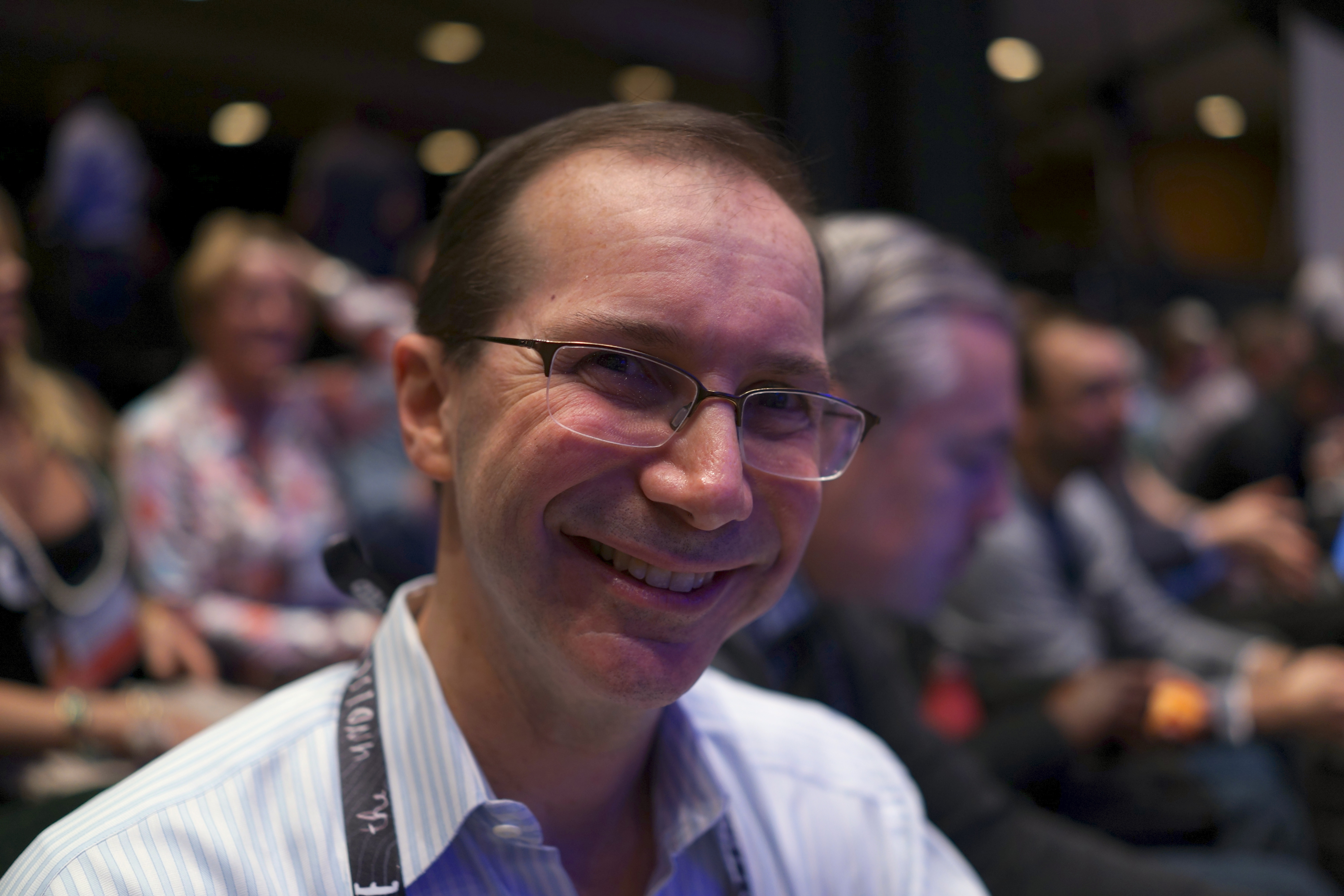
- Born: 1958 (age 67–68)
- Education: California Institute of Technology

William T. Gross (born 1958) is an American businessman and native of Southern California.

== Early life ==
Gross grew up in Encino, California and graduated with a Bachelor of Science in mechanical engineering from the California Institute of Technology.

== Career ==
He founded GNP Loudspeakers (now GNP Audio Video), an audio equipment manufacturer; Starship Video, a video arcade, GNP Development Inc., acquired by Lotus Development Corporation; Knowledge Adventure, an educational software company, later acquired by Cendant; and the business incubator Idealab in March, 1996, of which he serves as Chairman of the Board and Chief Executive Officer.

Gross serves on the boards of numerous companies. He is a member of the Board of Trustees of the California Institute of Technology and of the Art Center College of Design.

One company founded by Gross, GoTo.com, Inc., provided an Internet search engine which relied upon sponsored search results and pay-per-click advertisements. GoTo.com was later renamed Overture Services Inc. and was then acquired by Yahoo! to provide their Yahoo! Search Marketing products. That is why Bill Gross is widely credited with inventing the modern pay-per-click (PPC) business model for the Internet.

In 2010, Gross founded and launched TweetUp, a search engine for Twitter that promotes the best tweeters on any topic. TweetUp was renamed to "PostUp" to reflect its inclusion of Facebook and LinkedIn status updates.

On January 24, 2011, PostUp acquired popular Twitter client app UberTwitter—after previously purchasing Echofon (for iPhone/iOS) and Twidroyd (for Android OS)—and renamed itself UberMedia.

Bill Gross' Idealab has created more than 200 startup companies and roughly 10+ unicorns (companies with valuations $1B+) depending on definition and timing.

=== Solar energy ===
A Gross company, Energy Innovations, is working on development of a rooftop concentrated photovoltaic solar collector for flat-roofed commercial buildings. They completed the world's largest corporate solar installation at Google's headquarters in 2006.

During 2010, Gross was the CEO of eSolar, a company that aims to make renewable energy cost-competitive with fossil fuel energy using CSP technology. eSolar builds an individual 46 MW power unit on 200 acres and can scale up to 500 MW or larger capacity with multiple units.

Gross also founded Heliogen, a clean energy company backed by Bill Gates. The company has discovered a way to use artificial intelligence and a field of mirrors to reflect so much sunlight that it generates extreme heat above 1,000 degrees Celsius. Heliogen went public in 2021 through a merger with Athena SPACs. Bill Gross resigned as CEO in 2023 and in April 2023 made a tender offer to buy the company.

== Personal life ==
Gross's wife Marcia Goodstein is the daughter of David Goodstein and Judith R. Goodstein. They have five children.
