= Cartesian oval =

Class of geometric plane curves

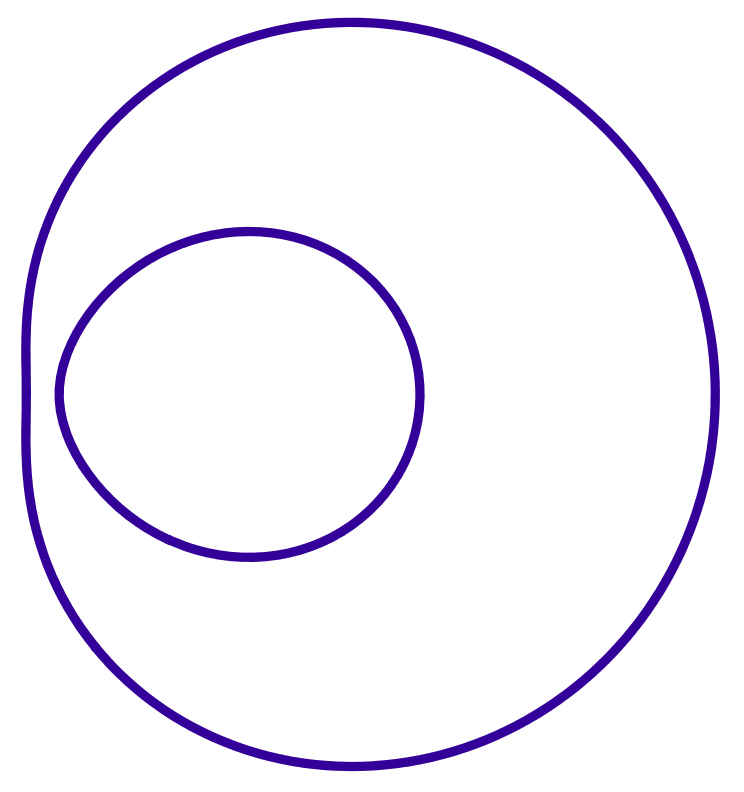
Example of Cartesian ovals.

In geometry, a Cartesian oval is a plane curve consisting of points that have the same linear combination of distances from two fixed points (foci). These curves are named after French mathematician René Descartes, who used them in optics.

== Definition ==
Let P and Q be fixed points in the plane, and let d(P, S) and d(Q, S) denote the Euclidean distances from these points to a third variable point S. Let m and a be arbitrary real numbers. Then the Cartesian oval is the locus of points S satisfying d(P, S) + m d(Q, S) = a. The two ovals formed by the four equations d(P, S) + m d(Q, S) = ± a and d(P, S) − m d(Q, S) = ± a are closely related; together they form a quartic plane curve called the ovals of Descartes.

== Special cases ==
In the equation d(P, S) + m d(Q, S) = a, when m = 1 and a > d(P, Q) the resulting shape is an ellipse. In the limiting case in which P and Q coincide, the ellipse becomes a circle. When $m = a/\!\operatorname{d}(P, Q)$ it is a limaçon of Pascal. If $m = -1$ and $0 < a < \operatorname{d}(P, Q)$ the equation gives a branch of a hyperbola and thus is not a closed oval.

== Polynomial equation ==
The set of points (x, y) satisfying the quartic polynomial equation

$$\left[(1-m^2)(x^2 + y^2) + 2m^2 cx + a^2 - m^2 c^2\right]^2 = 4a^2 (x^2+y^2)$$

where c is the distance $\text{d}(P,Q)$ between the two fixed foci P = (0, 0) and Q = (c, 0), forms two ovals, the sets of points satisfying two of the following four equations

$$\operatorname{d}(P, S) \pm m \operatorname{d}(Q, S) = a \,$$

$\operatorname{d}(P, S) \pm m \operatorname{d}(Q, S) = -a \,$

that have real solutions. The two ovals are generally disjoint, except in the case that P or Q belongs to them. At least one of the two perpendiculars to PQ through points P and Q cuts this quartic curve in four real points; it follows from this that they are necessarily nested, with at least one of the two points P and Q contained in the interiors of both of them. For a different parametrization and resulting quartic, see Lawrence.

== Applications in optics ==
As Descartes discovered, Cartesian ovals may be used in lens design. By choosing the ratio of distances from P and Q to match the ratio of sines in Snell's law, and using the surface of revolution of one of these ovals, it is possible to design a so-called aplanatic lens, that has no spherical aberration.

Additionally, if a spherical wavefront is refracted through a spherical lens, or reflected from a concave spherical surface, the refracted or reflected wavefront takes on the shape of a Cartesian oval. The caustic formed by spherical aberration in this case may therefore be described as the evolute of a Cartesian oval.

== History ==
The ovals of Descartes were first studied by René Descartes in 1637, in connection with their applications in optics.

These curves were also studied by Newton beginning in 1664. One method of drawing certain specific Cartesian ovals, already used by Descartes, is analogous to a standard construction of an ellipse by a pinned thread. If one stretches a thread from a pin at one focus to wrap around a pin at a second focus, and ties the free end of the thread to a pen, the path taken by the pen, when the thread is stretched tight, forms a Cartesian oval with a 2:1 ratio between the distances from the two foci. However, Newton rejected such constructions as insufficiently rigorous. He defined the oval as the solution to a differential equation, constructed its subnormals, and again investigated its optical properties.

The French mathematician Michel Chasles discovered in the 19th century that, if a Cartesian oval is defined by two points P and Q, then there is in general a third point R on the same line such that the same oval is also defined by any pair of these three points.

James Clerk Maxwell rediscovered these curves, generalized them to curves defined by keeping constant the weighted sum of distances from three or more foci, and wrote a paper titled Observations on Circumscribed Figures Having a Plurality of Foci, and Radii of Various Proportions. An account of his results, titled On the description of oval curves, and those having a plurality of foci, was written by J.D. Forbes and presented to the Royal Society of Edinburgh in 1846, when Maxwell was at the young age of 14 (almost 15).

== See also ==
- Cassini oval
- Two-center bipolar coordinates
