= Tom M. Apostol =

American mathematician (1923–2016)

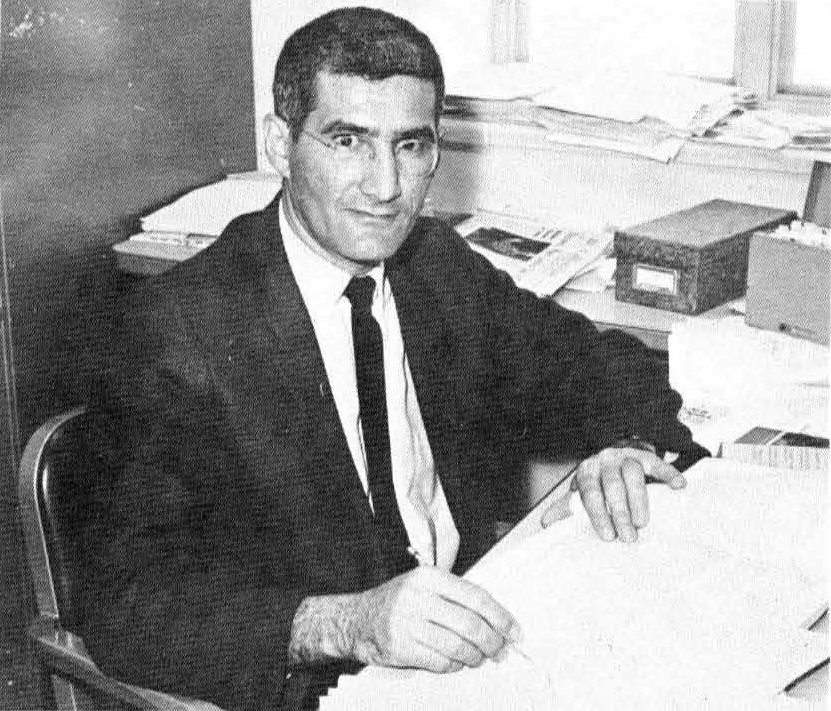
- Apostol in 1965
- Born: August 20, 1923; Helper, Utah, U.S.
- Died: May 8, 2016 (aged 92)
- Education: University of Washington (B.S., M.S.); University of California, Berkeley (Ph.D.)
- Scientific career
- Fields: Analytic number theory
- Workplaces: California Institute of Technology
- Doctoral advisor: Derrick Henry Lehmer
- Doctoral students: Basil Gordon; Abe Sklar

Tom Mike Apostol (/əˈpɑːsəl/ ə-POSS-əl; August 20, 1923 – May 8, 2016) was an American mathematician and professor at the California Institute of Technology specializing in analytic number theory, best known as the author of widely used mathematical textbooks, including Calculus in two volumes.

== Life and career ==
Apostol was born on August 20, 1923, in Helper, Utah. His parents, Emmanouil Apostolopoulos and Efrosini Papathanasopoulos, were Greek immigrants. Apostolopoulos's name was shortened to Mike Apostol when he obtained his United States citizenship, and Tom Apostol inherited this Americanized surname.

Apostol received his Bachelor of Science in chemical engineering in 1944, Master's degree in mathematics from the University of Washington in 1946, and a PhD in mathematics from the University of California, Berkeley in 1948. Thereafter Apostol was a faculty member at UC Berkeley, MIT, and Caltech. He was the author of several influential graduate and undergraduate level textbooks.

Apostol was the creator and project director for Project MATHEMATICS! producing videos which explore basic topics in high school mathematics. He helped popularize the visual calculus devised by Mamikon Mnatsakanian with whom he also wrote a number of papers, many of which appeared in the American Mathematical Monthly. He also provided academic content for an acclaimed video lecture series on introductory physics, The Mechanical Universe.

In 2001, Apostol was elected into the Academy of Athens as a Corresponding Member. He received the Lester R. Ford Award for expository excellence in 2005, 2008, and 2010. In 2012, he became a fellow of the American Mathematical Society.

== Bibliography ==
- Apostol, Tom M. (1957). Mathematical Analysis: A modern approach to advanced calculus (1st ed.). Addison-Wesley. ISBN 0-201-00288-4.
- Apostol, Tom M. (1961). Calculus, Volume 1: Introduction, with vectors and analytic geometry (1st ed.). Blaisdell.
- Apostol, Tom M. (1962). Calculus, Volume 2: Calculus of several variables with applications to probability and vector analysis (1st ed.). Blaisdell.
- Apostol, Tom M. (1967). Calculus, Volume 1: One-variable calculus, with an introduction to linear algebra (2nd ed.). Wiley. ISBN 0-536-00005-0. MR 0214705. Zbl 0148.28201.
- Apostol, Tom M. (1969). Calculus, Volume 2: Multi-variable calculus and linear algebra with applications to differential equations and probability (2nd ed.). Wiley. ISBN 0-471-00008-6.
- Apostol, Tom M. (1974). Mathematical Analysis (2nd ed.). Addison-Wesley. ISBN 978-0-201-00288-1.
- Apostol, Tom M. (1976). Introduction to Analytic Number Theory. Springer-Verlag. ISBN 0-387-90163-9.
- Apostol, Tom M. (1976). Modular Functions and Dirichlet Series in Number Theory (1st ed.). Springer-Verlag.
- Apostol, Tom M. (1990). Modular Functions and Dirichlet Series in Number Theory (2nd ed.). Springer-Verlag. ISBN 0-387-90185-X.
- Apostol, Tom M. (1997). Linear Algebra: A first course, with applications to differential equations. Wiley. ISBN 978-0-471-17421-9.
- Apostol, Tom M. (2008). The Mechanical Universe: Mechanics and heat, advanced edition (with Steven C. Frautschi, Richard P. Olenick, and David L. Goodstein ed.). Springer-Verlag. ISBN 0-521-30432-6.
- Apostol, Tom M. (2012). New Horizons in Geometry (with Mamikon Mnatsakanian ed.). MAA Press. ISBN 0-88385-354-X.
