= Tangent circles =

Circles related to a point in the plane

In geometry, tangent circles (also known as kissing circles) are circles in a common plane that intersect in a single point. There are two types of tangency: internal and external. Many problems and constructions in geometry are related to tangent circles; such problems often have real-life applications, such as trilateration and maximizing the use of materials.

== Two given circles ==
Ellipse and hyperbola as the locus of centers of circles tangent to two given intersecting circles.

Two circles are mutually and externally tangent if the distance between their centers is equal to the sum of their radii.

== Three given circles: Apollonius's problem ==
Apollonius's problem is to construct circles that are tangent to three given circles.

=== Apollonian gasket ===
If a circle is iteratively inscribed into the interstitial curved triangles between three mutually tangent circles, an Apollonian gasket results, one of the earliest fractals described in print.

Three mutually tangent circles of radii in ratios 4:4:1 yield a 3-4-5 Pythagorean triple triangle

== Malfatti's problem ==
Malfatti's problem is to carve three cylinders from a triangular block of marble, using as much of the marble as possible. In 1803, Gian Francesco Malfatti conjectured that the solution would be obtained by inscribing three mutually tangent circles into the triangle (a problem that had previously been considered by Japanese mathematician Ajima Naonobu); these circles are now known as the Malfatti circles, although the conjecture has been proven to be false.

== Six circles theorem ==
A chain of six circles can be drawn such that each circle is tangent to two sides of a given triangle and also to the preceding circle in the chain. The chain closes; the sixth circle is always tangent to the first circle.

== Generalizations ==
Problems involving tangent circles are often generalized to spheres. For example, the Fermat problem of finding sphere(s) tangent to four given spheres is a generalization of Apollonius's problem, whereas Soddy's hexlet is a generalization of a Steiner chain.

== See also ==
- Tangent lines to circles
- Circle packing theorem, the result that every planar graph may be realized by a system of tangent circles
- Feuerbach's theorem on the tangency of the nine-point circle of a triangle with its incircle and excircles
- Descartes's theorem on the radii of four pairwise tangent circles
- Ford circles, a system of circles tangent to the rational points on the number line and each other
- Arbelos, a shape formed by three tangent circles, one outside the other two
- Archimedean circle, additional circles associated with and sometimes tangent to an arbelos
- Ring lemma, on the radii of a ring of tangent circles surrounding a central circle
- Osculating circle
