= Coxeter's loxodromic sequence of tangent circles =

Circle packing

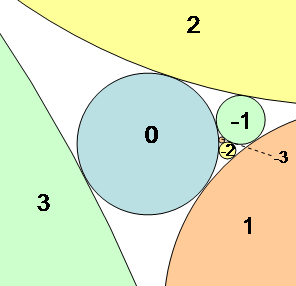
Blue circle 0 is tangent to circles 1, 2 and 3, as well as to preceding circles −1, −2 and −3.

In geometry, Coxeter's loxodromic sequence of tangent circles is an infinite sequence of circles arranged so that any four consecutive circles in the sequence are pairwise mutually tangent. This means that each circle in the sequence is tangent to the three circles that precede it and also to the three circles that follow it.

== Properties ==
The radii of the circles in the sequence form a geometric progression with ratio
$$k=\varphi + \sqrt{\varphi} \approx 2.89005 \ ,$$
where $\varphi$ is the golden ratio. This ratio $k$ and its reciprocal satisfy the equation
$$(1+x+x^2+x^3)^2=2(1+x^2+x^4+x^6)\ ,$$
and so any four consecutive circles in the sequence meet the conditions of Descartes's theorem.

The centres of the circles in the sequence lie on a logarithmic spiral. Viewed from the centre of the spiral, the angle between the centres of successive circles is
$$\cos^{-1} \left( \frac {-1} {\varphi} \right) \approx 128.173 ^ \circ \ .$$
The angle between consecutive triples of centers is
$$\theta=\cos^{-1}\frac{1}{\varphi}\approx 51.8273^\circ,$$
the same as one of the angles of the Kepler triangle, a right triangle whose construction also involves the square root of the golden ratio.

== History and related constructions ==
The construction is named after geometer H. S. M. Coxeter, who generalised the two-dimensional case to sequences of spheres and hyperspheres in higher dimensions. It can be interpreted as a degenerate special case of the Doyle spiral.

== See also ==
- Apollonian gasket
