= Inversive distance =

Concept in inversive geometry

In inversive geometry, the inversive distance is a way of measuring the "distance" between two circles, regardless of whether the circles cross each other, are tangent to each other, or are disjoint from each other.

== Properties ==
The inversive distance remains unchanged if the circles are inverted, or transformed by a Möbius transformation. One pair of circles can be transformed to another pair by a Möbius transformation if and only if both pairs have the same inversive distance.

An analogue of the Beckman–Quarles theorem holds true for the inversive distance: if a bijection of the set of circles in the inversive plane preserves the inversive distance between pairs of circles at some chosen fixed distance $\delta$, then it must be a Möbius transformation that preserves all inversive distances.

== Distance formula ==
For two circles in the Euclidean plane with radii $r$ and $R$, and distance $d$ between their centers, the inversive distance can be defined by the formula

$$I=\frac{d^2-r^2-R^2}{2rR}.$$

This formula gives:

- a value greater than 1 for two disjoint circles,
- a value of 1 for two circles that are tangent to each other and both outside each other,
- a value between −1 and 1 for two circles that intersect,
  - a value of 0 for two circles that intersect each other at right angles,
- a value of −1 for two circles that are tangent to each other, one inside of the other,
- and a value less than −1 when one circle contains the other.

(Some authors define the absolute inversive distance as the absolute value of the inversive distance.)

Some authors modify this formula by taking the inverse hyperbolic cosine of the value given above, rather than the value itself. That is, rather than using the number $I$ as the inversive distance, the distance is instead defined as the number $\delta$ obeying the equation

$$\delta=\operatorname{arcosh}( I).$$

Although transforming the inversive distance in this way makes the distance formula more complicated, and prevents its application to crossing pairs of circles, it has the advantage that (like the usual distance for points on a line) the distance becomes additive for circles in a pencil of circles. That is, if three circles belong to a common pencil, then (using $\delta$ in place of $I$ as the inversive distance) one of their three pairwise distances will be the sum of the other two.

== In other geometries ==
It is also possible to define the inversive distance for circles on a sphere, or for circles in the hyperbolic plane.

== Applications ==
=== Steiner chains ===
A Steiner chain for two disjoint circles is a finite cyclic sequence of additional circles, each of which is tangent to the two given circles and to its two neighbors in the chain. Steiner's porism states that if two circles have a Steiner chain, they have infinitely many such chains. The chain is allowed to wrap more than once around the two circles, and can be characterized by a rational number $p$ whose numerator is the number of circles in the chain and whose denominator is the number of times it wraps around. All chains for the same two circles have the same value of $p$. If the inversive distance between the two circles (after taking the inverse hyperbolic cosine) is $\delta$, then $p$ can be found by the formula

$$p=\frac{\pi}{\sin^{-1}\tanh(\delta/2)}.$$

Conversely, every two disjoint circles for which this formula gives a rational number will support a Steiner chain. More generally, an arbitrary pair of disjoint circles can be approximated arbitrarily closely by pairs of circles that support Steiner chains whose $p$ values are rational approximations to the value of this formula for the given two circles.

=== Circle packings ===
The inversive distance has been used to define the concept of an inversive-distance circle packing: a collection of circles such that a specified subset of pairs of circles (corresponding to the edges of a planar graph ) have a given inversive distance with respect to each other. This concept generalizes the circle packings described by the circle packing theorem, in which specified pairs of circles are tangent to each other. Although less is known about the existence of inversive distance circle packings than for tangent circle packings, it is known that, when they exist, they can be uniquely specified (up to Möbius transformations) by a given maximal planar graph and set of Euclidean or hyperbolic inversive distances. This rigidity property can be generalized broadly, to Euclidean or hyperbolic metrics on triangulated manifolds with angular defects at their vertices. However, for manifolds with spherical geometry, these packings are no longer unique. In turn, inversive-distance circle packings have been used to construct approximations to conformal mappings.
