= Gaussian rational =

Complex number with rational components

In mathematics, a Gaussian rational number is a complex number of the form p + qi, where p and q are both rational numbers. The set of all Gaussian rationals forms the Gaussian rational field, denoted Q(i), obtained by adjoining the imaginary number i to the field of rationals Q.

== Properties of the field ==
The field of Gaussian rationals provides an example of an algebraic number field that is both a quadratic field and a cyclotomic field (since i is a 4th root of unity). Like all quadratic fields it is a Galois extension of Q with Galois group cyclic of order two, in this case generated by complex conjugation, and is thus an abelian extension of Q, with conductor 4.

As with cyclotomic fields more generally, the field of Gaussian rationals is neither ordered nor complete (as a metric space). The Gaussian integers Z[i] form the ring of integers of Q(i). The set of all Gaussian rationals is countably infinite.

The field of Gaussian rationals is also a two-dimensional vector space over Q with natural basis $\{1, i\}$.

== Ford spheres ==
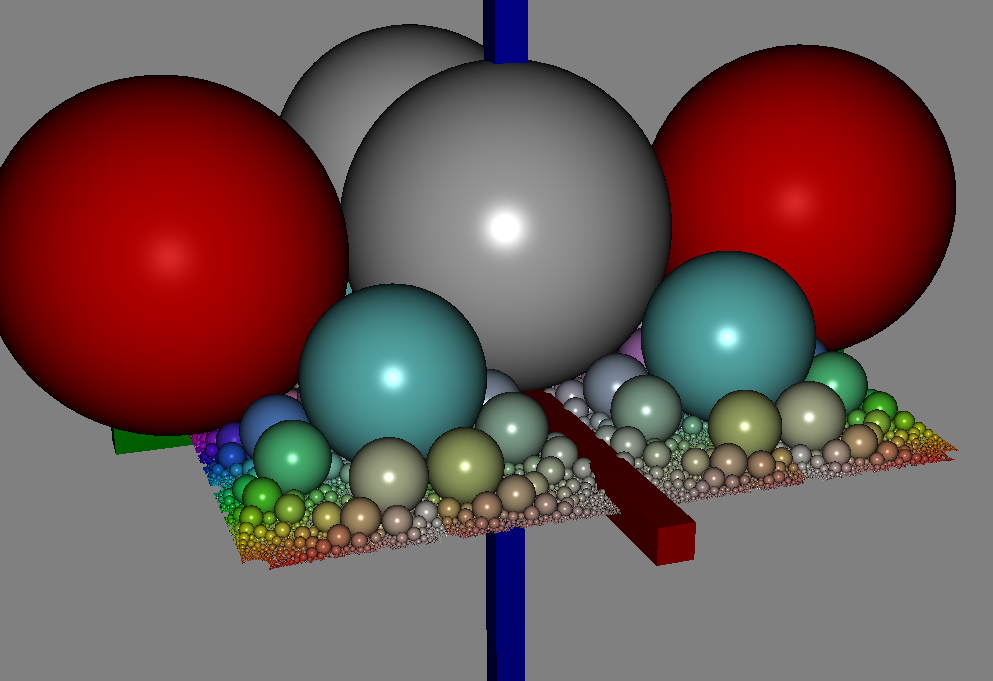
Subset of the Ford spheres

The concept of Ford circles can be generalized from the rational numbers to the Gaussian rationals, giving Ford spheres. In this construction, the complex numbers are embedded as a plane in a three-dimensional Euclidean space, and for each Gaussian rational point in this plane one constructs a sphere tangent to the plane at that point. For a Gaussian rational represented in lowest terms as $p/q$ (i.e. $p$ and $q$ are relatively prime), the radius of this sphere should be $1/2|q|^2$ where $|q|^2 = q \bar q$ is the squared modulus, and $\bar q$ is the complex conjugate. The resulting spheres are tangent for pairs of Gaussian rationals $P/Q$ and $p/q$ with $|Pq-pQ|=1$, and otherwise they do not intersect each other.
