= Soddy's hexlet =

Chain of 6 spheres tangent to 3 given spheres

A family of hexlets related by a rotation and scaling. The centers of the spheres fall on an ellipse (dashed blue), making it an elliptic hexlet.

In geometry, Soddy's hexlet is a chain of six spheres, each of which is tangent to both of its neighbors and also to three mutually tangent given spheres.

Soddy's hexlet was discovered in Japan, as shown by Sangaku tablets from 1822 in Kanagawa Prefecture. Frederick Soddy rediscovered it independently in a 1937 paper. Soddy proved that it is always possible to find a hexlet for any choice of mutually tangent spheres A, B and C. Indeed, there is an infinite family of hexlets related by rotation and scaling of the cycle of six spheres in the hexlet, and another infinite family related by rotation and scaling of the other three spheres; in this, Soddy's hexlet is the spherical analog of a Steiner chain of six circles. The centers of the hexlet spheres lie in a single plane, on a conic section.

== Definition ==
Soddy's hexlet is a chain of six spheres, labeled S_{1} through S_{6}, each of which is tangent to three given spheres, A, B and C, that are themselves mutually tangent at three distinct points.

Each sphere of Soddy's hexlet is also tangent to its neighbors in the chain; for example, sphere S_{4} is tangent to S_{3} and S_{5}. The chain is closed, meaning that every sphere in the chain has two tangent neighbors; in particular, the initial and final spheres, S_{1} and S_{6}, are tangent to one another.

== Annular hexlet ==
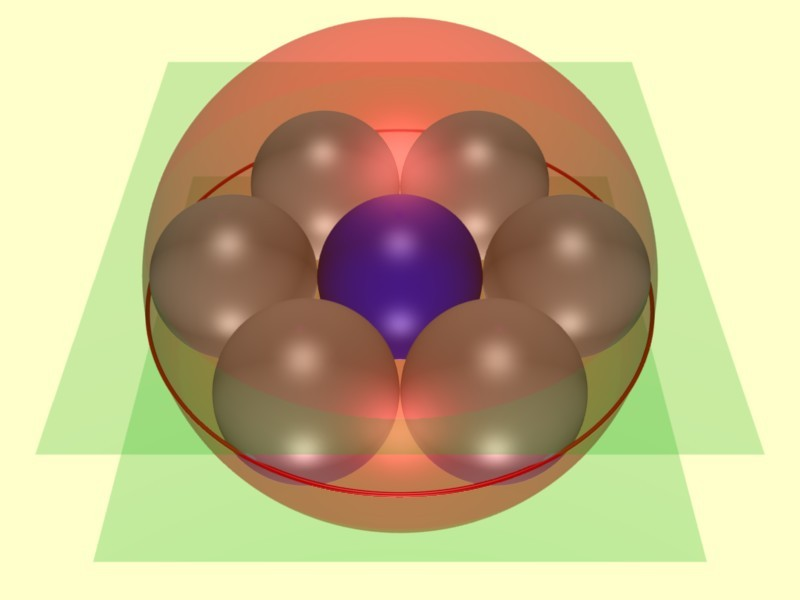
An annular hexlet. The three spheres tangent to the hexlet are the blue central sphere and the two parallel green planes, considered as degenerate spheres. The red sphere is not part of the hexlet.

The annular Soddy's hexlet is a special case, in which the three mutually tangent spheres consist of a single sphere of radius r (blue) sandwiched between two parallel planes (green) separated by a perpendicular distance 2r. In this case, Soddy's hexlet consists of six spheres of radius r packed like ball bearings around the central sphere and likewise sandwiched.

The chain of six spheres can be rotated about the central sphere without affecting their tangencies, showing that there is an infinite family of solutions for this case. As they are rotated, the spheres of the hexlet trace out a torus (a doughnut-shaped surface); this torus is the envelope of this family of hexlets.

== Solution by inversion ==
The general problem of finding a hexlet for three given mutually tangent spheres A, B and C can be reduced to the annular case using inversion. This geometrical operation always transforms spheres into spheres or into planes, which may be regarded as spheres of infinite radius. A sphere is transformed into a plane if and only if the sphere passes through the center of inversion. An advantage of inversion is that it preserves tangency; if two spheres are tangent before the transformation, they remain so after. Thus, if the inversion transformation is chosen judiciously, the problem can be reduced to a simpler case, such as the annular Soddy's hexlet. Inversion is reversible; repeating an inversion in the same point returns the transformed objects to their original size and position.

Inversion in the point of tangency between spheres A, B transforms them into parallel planes, which may be denoted as a and b. Since sphere C is tangent to both A and B and does not pass through the center of inversion, C is transformed into another sphere c that is tangent to both planes; hence, c is sandwiched between the two planes a and b. This is the annular Soddy's hexlet (Figure 2). Six spheres s_{1}–s_{6} may be packed around c and likewise sandwiched between the bounding planes a and b. Re-inversion restores the three original spheres, and transforms s_{1}–s_{6} into a hexlet for the original problem. In general, these hexlet spheres S_{1}–S_{6} have different radii.

An infinite variety of hexlets may be generated by rotating the six balls s_{1}–s_{6} in their plane by an arbitrary angle before re-inverting them. The envelope produced by such rotations is the torus that surrounds the sphere c and is sandwiched between the two planes a and b; thus, the torus has an inner radius r and outer radius 3r. After the re-inversion, this torus becomes a Dupin cyclide (Figure 3).

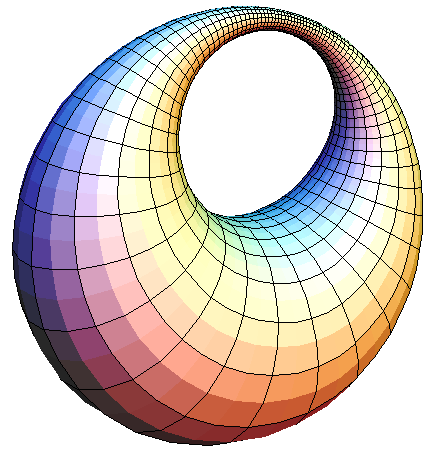
Figure 3: A Dupin cyclide, through which the hexlet spheres rotate, always touching. The cyclide is tangent to an inner sphere, an outer sphere and two spheres above and below the "hole" in the "doughnut".

== Dupin cyclide ==
The envelope of Soddy's hexlets is a Dupin cyclide, an inversion of the torus. Thus Soddy's construction shows that a cyclide of Dupin is the envelope of a 1-parameter family of spheres in two different ways, and each sphere in either family is tangent to two spheres in same family and three spheres in the other family. This result was probably known to Charles Dupin, who discovered the cyclides that bear his name in his 1803 dissertation under Gaspard Monge.

== Relation to Steiner chains ==
Figure 4: Steiner chain of six circles corresponding to a Soddy's hexlet.

The intersection of the hexlet with the plane of its spherical centers produces a Steiner chain of six circles.

== Parabolic and hyperbolic hexlets ==
It is assumed that spheres A and B are the same size.

In any elliptic hexlet, such as the one shown at the top of the article, there are two tangent planes to the hexlet. In order for an elliptic hexlet to exist, the radius of C must be less than one quarter that of A. If C's radius is one quarter of A's, each sphere will become a plane in the journey. The inverted image shows a normal elliptic hexlet, though, and in the parabolic hexlet, the point where a sphere turns into a plane is precisely when its inverted image passes through the centre of inversion. In such a hexlet there is only one tangent plane to the hexlet. The line of the centres of a parabolic hexlet is a parabola.

If C is even larger than that, a hyperbolic hexlet is formed, and now there are no tangent planes at all. Label the spheres S_{1} to S_{6}. S_{1} thus cannot go very far until it becomes a plane (where its inverted image passes through the centre of inversion) and then reverses its concavity (where its inverted image surrounds the centre of inversion). Now the line of the centres is a hyperbola.

The limiting case is when A, B and C are all the same size. The hexlet now becomes straight. S_{1} is small as it passes through the hole between A, B and C, and grows till it becomes a plane tangent to them. The centre of inversion is now also with a point of tangency with the image of S_{6}, so it is also a plane tangent to A, B and C. As S_{1} proceeds, its concavity is reversed and now it surrounds all the other spheres, tangent to A, B, C, S_{2} and S_{6}. S_{2} pushes upwards and grows to become a tangent plane and S_{6} shrinks. S_{1} then obtains S_{6}'s former position as a tangent plane. It then reverses concavity again and passes through the hole again, beginning another round trip. Now the line of centres is a degenerate hyperbola, where it has collapsed into two straight lines.

== Sangaku tablets ==
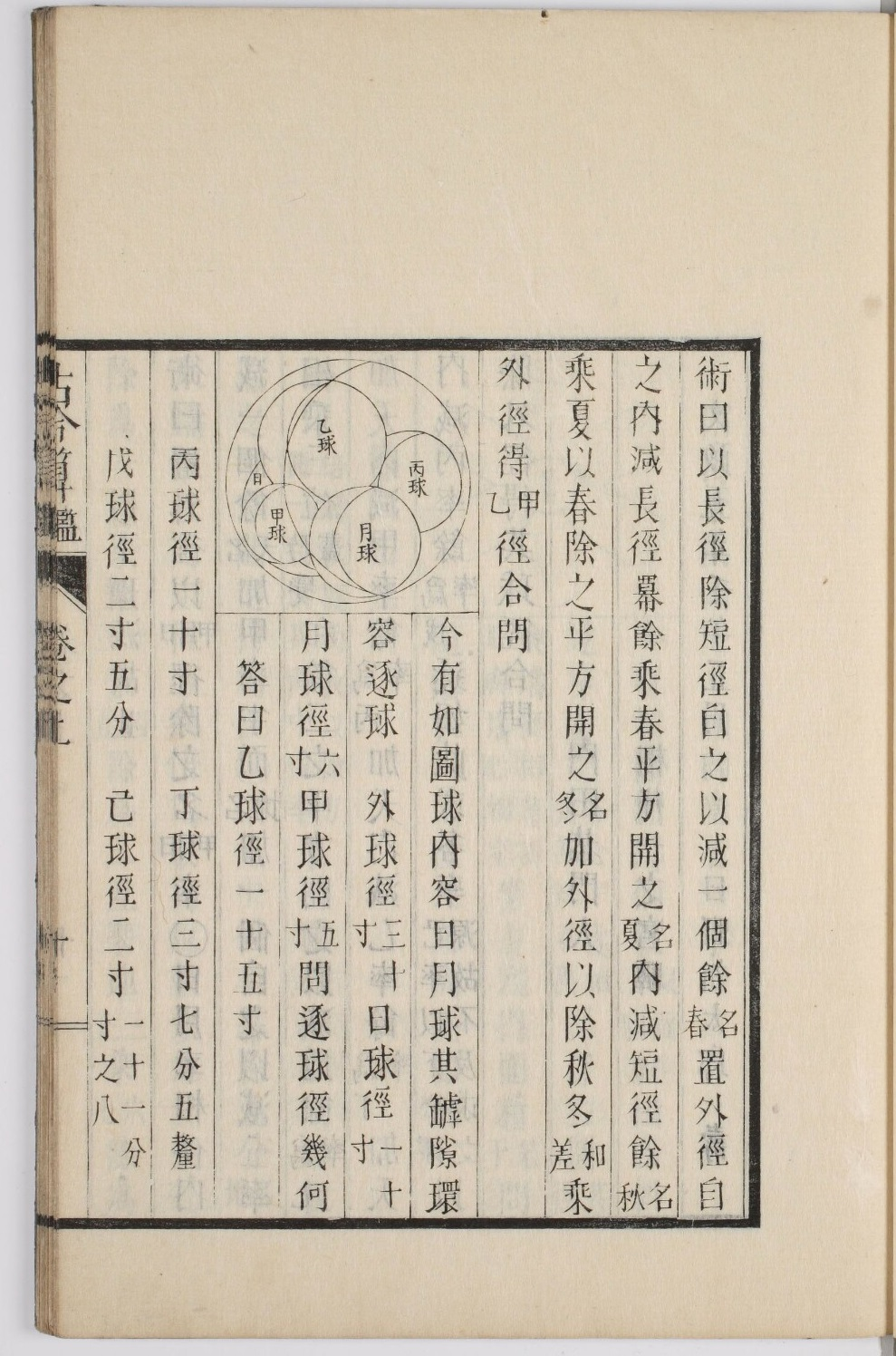
Soddy's hexlet problem in Japanese mathematics book Kokonsankan (1832).

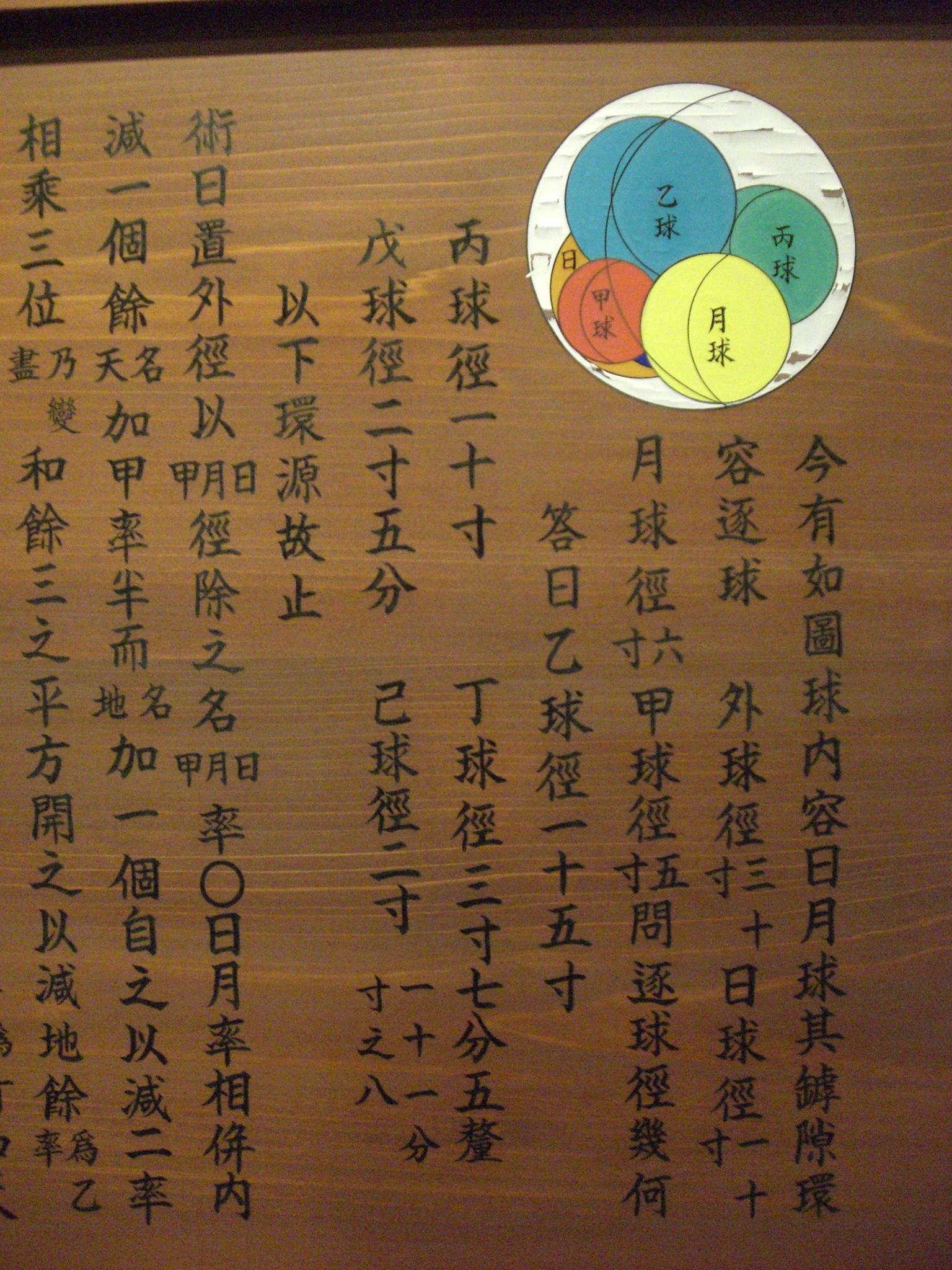
Replica of Sangaku at Hōtoku museum in Samukawa Shrine.

Japanese mathematicians discovered the same hexlet over one hundred years before Soddy did. They analysed the packing problems in which circles and polygons, balls and polyhedrons come into contact and often found the relevant theorems independently before their discovery by Western mathematicians. They often published these as sangaku. The sangaku about the hexlet was made by Irisawa Shintarō Hiroatsu in the school of Uchida Itsumi, and dedicated to the Samukawa Shrine in May 1822. The original sangaku has been lost but was recorded in Uchida's book of Kokonsankan in 1832. A replica of the sangaku was made from the record and dedicated to the Hōtoku museum in the Samukawa Shrine in August, 2009.

The sangaku by Irisawa consists of three problems. The third problem relates to Soddy's hexlet: "the diameter of the outer circumscribing sphere is 30 sun. The diameters of the nucleus balls are 10 sun and 6 sun each. The diameter of one of the balls in the chain of balls is 5 sun. Then I asked for the diameters of the remaining balls. The answer is 15 sun, 10 sun, 3.75 sun, 2.5 sun and 2 + 8/11 sun."

In his answer, the method for calculating the diameters of the balls is written down and, when converted into mathematical notation, gives the following solution. If the ratios of the diameter of the outside ball to each of the nucleus balls are a_{1}, a_{2}, and if the ratios of the diameter to the chain balls are c_{1}, ..., c_{6}. we want to represent c_{2}, ..., c_{6} in terms of a_{1}, a_{2}, and c_{1}. If
$$K = \sqrt{3\left[ a_1 a_2+a_2 c_1+c_1 a_1- \left( \frac{a_1+a_2+c_1+1}{2} \right)^2 \right]}$$
then
$$\begin{align}
c_2&=(a_1+a_2+c_1-1)/2-K \\
c_3&=(3a_1+3a_2-c_1-3)/2-K \\
c_4&=2a_1+2a_2-c_1-2 \\
c_5&=(3a_1+3a_2-c_1-3)/2+K \\
c_6&=(a_1+a_2+c_1-1)/2+K
\end{align}$$
thus
$$c_1 + c_4 = c_2 + c_5 = c_3 + c_6.$$

If r_{1}, ..., r_{6} are the diameters of six balls, we get the formula:

$$\frac{1}{r_1}+\frac{1}{r_4}=\frac{1}{r_2}+\frac{1}{r_5}=\frac{1}{r_3}+\frac{1}{r_6}.$$

== See also ==
- Descartes's theorem
- Inversive geometry
- Sangaku
