= Pappus chain =

Ring of circles between two tangent circles

A Pappus chain

In geometry, the Pappus chain is a ring of circles between two tangent circles investigated by Pappus of Alexandria in the 3rd century AD.

== Construction ==
Given two circles C_{U} and C_{V}, let the inner circle C_{U} be enclosed by the outer circle C_{V}, and let the two circles be tangent to each other at point A. Let the radii of these two circles be denoted as r_{U}, r_{V}, respectively, and let their respective centers be the points U, V. The Pappus chain consists of the circles in the shaded grey region, which are externally tangent to C_{U} (the inner circle) and internally tangent to C_{V} (the outer circle). Let the radius, diameter and center point of the n^{th} circle of the Pappus chain be denoted as r_{n}, d_{n}, P_{n}, respectively.

The Pappus chain is often considered with respect to an arbelos, a circular triangle whose three sides are semicircles of the two given tangent circles and of the circle in the chain whose center is collinear with the two given circles.

== Properties ==
=== Centers of the circles ===
==== Ellipse ====
All the centers of the circles in the Pappus chain are located on a common ellipse, for the following reason. The sum of the distances from the n^{th} circle of the Pappus chain to the two centers U, V of the arbelos circles equals a constant

$$\overline{P_nU} + \overline{P_nV} =
(r_U + r_n) + (r_V - r_n) = r_U + r_V$$

Thus, the foci of this ellipse are U, V, the centers of the two circles that define the arbelos; these points correspond to the midpoints of the line segments A̅B̅, A̅C̅, respectively.

==== Coordinates ====
If $r = \tfrac{\overline{AC}}{\overline{AB}},$ then the center of the nth circle in the chain is:

$$(x_n,y_n) = \left(\frac{r(1+r)}{2[n^2(1-r)^2+r]}~,~\frac {nr(1-r)}{n^2(1-r)^2+r}\right)$$

=== Radii of the circles ===
If $r = \tfrac{\overline{AC}}{\overline{AB}},$ then the radius of the nth circle in the chain is:
$$r_n = \frac {(1-r)r}{2[n^2(1-r)^2 + r]}\times(AB)$$

=== Circle inversion ===
Under a particular inversion centered on A, the four initial circles of the Pappus chain are transformed into a stack of four equally sized circles, sandwiched between two parallel lines. This accounts for the height formula h_{n} = nd_{n} and the fact that the original points of tangency lie on a common circle.

The height h_{n} of the center of the n^{th} circle above the base diameter ACB equals n times d_{n}. This may be shown by inverting in a circle centered on the tangent point A. The circle of inversion is chosen to intersect the n^{th} circle perpendicularly, so that the n^{th} circle is transformed into itself. The two arbelos circles, C_{U} and C_{V}, are transformed into parallel lines tangent to and sandwiching the n^{th} circle; hence, the other circles of the Pappus chain are transformed into similarly sandwiched circles of the same diameter. The initial circle C_{0} and the final circle C_{n} each contribute 1/2d_{n} to the height h_{n}, whereas the circles C_{1} to C_{n−1} each contribute d_{n}. Adding these contributions together yields the equation h_{n} = nd_{n}.

The same inversion can be used to show that the points where the circles of the Pappus chain are tangent to one another lie on a common circle. As noted above, the inversion centered at point A transforms the arbelos circles C_{U}, C_{V} into two parallel lines, and the circles of the Pappus chain into a stack of equally sized circles sandwiched between the two parallel lines. Hence, the points of tangency between the transformed circles lie on a line midway between the two parallel lines. Undoing the inversion in the circle, this line of tangent points is transformed back into a circle.

=== Steiner chain ===
In these properties of having centers on an ellipse and tangencies on a circle, the Pappus chain is analogous to the Steiner chain, in which finitely many circles are tangent to two circles.

== Bibliography ==
- Ogilvy, C. S. (1990). Excursions in Geometry. Dover. pp. 54–55. ISBN 0-486-26530-7.
- Bankoff, L. (1981). "How did Pappus do it?". In Klarner, D. A. (ed.). The Mathematical Gardner. Boston: Prindle, Weber, & Schmidt. pp. 112–118.
- Johnson, R. A. (1960). Advanced Euclidean Geometry: An elementary treatise on the geometry of the triangle and the circle (reprint of 1929 edition by Houghton Mifflin ed.). New York: Dover Publications. pp. 116–117. ISBN 978-0-486-46237-0.
- Wells, D. (1991). The Penguin Dictionary of Curious and Interesting Geometry. New York: Penguin Books. pp. 5–6. ISBN 0-14-011813-6.
