= List of circle topics =

Ford circles.

This list of circle topics includes things related to the geometric shape, either abstractly, as in idealizations studied by geometers, or concretely in physical space. It does not include metaphors like "inner circle" or "circular reasoning" in which the word does not refer literally to the geometric shape.

== Geometry and other areas of mathematics ==
- Circle

Circle anatomy

- Annulus (mathematics) – Region between two concentric circles
- Area of a disk – Concept in geometry
- Bipolar coordinates – 2-dimensional orthogonal coordinate system based on Apollonian circles
- Central angle – Angle between two radii of a circle
- Circular sector – Portion of a disk enclosed by two radii and an arc
- Circular segment – Area bounded by a circular arc and a straight line
- Circumference – Perimeter of a circle or ellipse
- Concentric – Geometric objects with a common centre
- Concyclic – Points on a common circle
- Degree (angle) – Unit of plane angle where a full circle equals 360°
- Diameter – Straight line segment that passes through the centre of a circle
- Disk (mathematics) – Plane figure, bounded by circle
- Horn angle – Type of curvilinear angle
- Measurement of a Circle
- π – Number, approximately 3.14
  - List of topics related to π
- Pole and polar – Unique point and line of a conic section
- Power of a point – Relative distance of a point from a circle
- Radical axis – All points whose relative distances to two circles are same
- Radius – Line segment in a circle or sphere from its center to its perimeter or surface
  - Radius of convergence – Domain of convergence of power series
  - Radius of curvature – Radius of the circle which best approximates a curve at a given point
- Sphere – Set of points equidistant from a center
- Tangent lines to circles – Line which touches a circle at exactly one point
- Versor – Quaternion of norm 1 (unit quaternion)

Specific circles

- Apollonian circles – Circles in two perpendicular families
- Circles of Apollonius – Several sets of circles associated with Apollonius of Perga
- Archimedean circle – Circle in the arbelos congruent to the twin circles
- Archimedes' circles – the twin circles doubtfully attributed to Archimedes
- Archimedes' quadruplets – Four congruent circles associated with an arbelos
- Circle of antisimilitude
- Bankoff circle – Circle constructed from an arbelos
- Brocard circle – Circle constructed from a triangle
- Carlyle circle – Circle associated with a quadratic equation
- Circumscribed circle (circumcircle)
  - Midpoint-stretching polygon
- Coaxal circles – Circles in two perpendicular families
- Director circle – Circle formed by all 90° crossings of tangents of an ellipse or hyperbola
- Fermat–Apollonius circle – Circle formed by all 90° crossings of tangents of an ellipse or hyperbola
- Ford circle – Rational circle tangent to the real line
- Fuhrmann circle – Circle derived from a triangle
- Generalised circle – Concept in geometry including line and circle
- GEOS circle – Intersection of four lines associated with a generalized triangle
- Great circle – Spherical geometry analog of a straight line
  - Great-circle distance – Shortest distance between two points on the surface of a sphere
  - Circle of a sphere – Mathematical expression of circle like slices of sphere
- Horocycle – Curve whose normals converge asymptotically
- Incircle and excircles of a triangle – Circles tangent to all three sides of a triangle
- Inscribed circle – Circles tangent to all three sides of a triangle
- Johnson circles – Geometric theorem regarding 3 circles intersecting at a point
- Magic circle (mathematics) – Chinese mathematical arrangement
- Malfatti circles – Three tangent circles in a triangle
- Nine-point circle – Circle constructed from a triangle
- Orthocentroidal circle – Circle constructed from a triangle
- Osculating circle – Circle of immediate corresponding curvature of a curve at a point
- Riemannian circle – Great circle with a characteristic length
- Schinzel circle – Theorem about circles through lattice points
- Schoch circles – Archimedean circles constructed by Thomas Schoch
- Spieker circle – Inscribed circle of a triangle's medial triangle
- Tangent circles – Circles related to a point in the plane
- Taylor circle – Special circle in geometry
- Twin circles – Two congruent circles within an arbelos
- Unit circle – Circle with radius of one
- Van Lamoen circle – Circle associated with any given triangle
- Villarceau circles – Intersection of a torus and a plane
- Woo circles

Circle-derived entities

- Apollonian gasket – Fractal composed of tangent circles
- Arbelos – Plane region bounded by three semicircles
- Bicentric polygon – Cyclic polygon all of whose sides are tangent to an incircle
- Bicentric quadrilateral – Convex, 4-sided shape with an incircle and a circumcircle
- Coxeter's loxodromic sequence of tangent circles – Circle packing
- Cyclic quadrilateral – Quadrilateral whose vertices lie on a circle
- Cycloid – Curve traced by a point on a rolling circle
- Ex-tangential quadrilateral – Convex 4-sided polygon whose sidelines are all tangent to an outside circle
- Hawaiian earring – Topological space defined by the union of circles
- Inscribed angle – Angle formed in the interior of a circle
- Inscribed angle theorem – Angle formed in the interior of a circle
- Inversive distance – Concept in inversive geometry
- Inversive geometry – Study of angle-preserving transformations
- Irrational rotation – Rotation of a circle by an angle of π times an irrational number
- Lens (geometry) – Convex plane region bounded by two circular arcs
- Lune – Crescent shape bounded by two circular arcs
  - Lune of Hippocrates – Geometric construction
- Lazy caterer's sequence – Counts pieces of a disk cut by lines
- Overlapping circles grid – Geometric pattern used in art
- Pappus chain – Ring of circles between two tangent circles
- Polar circle (geometry) – Unique circle centered at a given triangle's orthocenter
- Power center (geometry) – For 3 circles, the intersection of the radical axes of each pair
- Salinon – Geometric shape
- Semicircle – Geometric shape
- Squircle – Shape between a square and a circle
- Steiner chain – Set of circles related by tangency
- Tangential polygon – Convex polygon that contains an inscribed circle
- Tangential quadrilateral

Roulettes

- Centered trochoid – Geometric curve formed by a circle rolling along another circle
- Epitrochoid – Plane curve formed by rolling a circle on the outside of another

- Epicycloid – Plane curve traced by a point on a circle rolled around another circle
- Cardioid – Type of plane curve
- Nephroid – Plane curve; an epicycloid with radii differing by 1/2
- Deferent and epicycle – Planetary motions in archaic models of the Solar System

- Hypotrochoid – Curve traced by a point outside a circle rolling within another circle

- Hypocycloid – Curve traced by a point on a circle rolling within another circle
- Astroid – Curve generated by rolling a circle inside another circle with 4x or (4/3)x the radius
- Deltoid curve

Topology

- Borromean rings – Three linked but pairwise separated rings
- Circle bundle – Principal fiber bundle
- Quasicircle

Circle-related theory

- Apollonius' problem – Geometry problem about finding touching circles
  - Limiting cases of Apollonius' problem – Construct all the circles that are tangent to three given circles
- Belt problem – Mathematics problem
- Benz plane – Geometrical structure
- Bertrand's paradox (probability) – Probability theory paradox
- Bonnesen's inequality – Geometric inequality
- Brahmagupta's formula – Formula relating the area of a cyclic quadrilateral to its side lengths
- Buffon's needle problem – Question in geometric probability
- Bundle theorem
- Butterfly theorem – Theorem about circles
- Carnot's theorem – Theorem in Euclidean geometry
- Casey's theorem – On four non-intersecting circles that lie inside a bigger circle and tangent to it
- Circle graph – Intersection graph of a chord diagram
- Circle map – Structurally stable features in coupled oscillation dynamical systems.
- Circle packing – Field of geometry closely arranging circles on a plane
  - Circle packing in a circle – Two-dimensional packing problem
  - Circle packing in an equilateral triangle – Two-dimensional packing problem
  - Circle packing in an isosceles right triangle – Two-dimensional packing problem
  - Circle packing theorem – On tangency patterns of circles
  - Introduction to Circle Packing – a book by Kenneth Stephenson
- Circular surface
- Clifford's circle theorems – Sequence of theorems relating to sets of circles intersecting at a common point
- Compass and straightedge – Method of drawing geometric objects
  - Mohr–Mascheroni theorem – Theorem in Euclidean geometry
  - Poncelet–Steiner theorem – Universality of construction using just a straightedge and a single circle with center
- Descartes's theorem – Equation for radii of tangent circles
- Dinostratus' theorem – Curve where spinning and moving lines cross
- Dividing a circle into areas – Problem in geometry
- Equal incircles theorem – On rays from a point to a line, with equal inscribed circles between adjacent rays
- Five circles theorem – Derives a pentagram from five chained circles centered on a common sixth circle
- Gauss circle problem – How many integer lattice points there are in a circle
- Gershgorin circle theorem – Bound on eigenvalues
- Geometrography – Study of geometrical constructions
- Goat grazing problem – Recreational mathematics planar boundary and area problem
- Hadamard three-circle theorem – Theorem in complex analysis
- Hardy–Littlewood circle method – Technique in analytic number theory
- Isoperimetric problem – Geometric inequality applicable to any closed curve
- Japanese theorem for cyclic polygons – Theorem in Euclidean geometry
- Japanese theorem for cyclic quadrilaterals – Centers of the incircles of triangles inside a cyclic quadrilateral form a rectangle
- Kosnita's theorem – Geometric theorem regarding circles and triangles
- Lester's theorem – Several points associated with a scalene triangle lie on the same circle
- Milne-Thomson circle theorem
- Miquel's theorem – Concerns 3 circles through triples of points on the vertices and sides of a triangle
- Monge's theorem – Theorem in plane geometry
- Mrs. Miniver's problem – Problem on areas of intersecting circles
- Pivot theorem – Concerns 3 circles through triples of points on the vertices and sides of a triangle
- Pizza theorem – Equality of areas of a sliced disk
- Squaring the circle – Problem of constructing equal-area shapes
- Poncelet's porism – Theorem of 2D geometry
- Ptolemy's theorem – Relates the 4 sides and 2 diagonals of a quadrilateral with vertices on a common circle
- Ptolemy's table of chords – 2nd century AD trigonometric table
- Regiomontanus' angle maximization problem – Famous mathematical optimization problem
- Ring lemma – Lower bound on radii in circle packings
- Seven circles theorem – Theorem about seven tangent circles
- Six circles theorem – Relates to a chain of six circles together with a triangle
- Smallest circle problem – Finding the smallest circle that contains all given points
- Tammes problem – Circle-packing on the surface of a sphere
- Tarski's circle-squaring problem – Problem of cutting and reassembling a disk into a square
- Thales' theorem

Circle tangents in non-geometric theory

- Circle criterion
- Circle group – Lie group of complex numbers of unit modulus; topologically a circle
  - Group of rational points on the unit circle – Complex numbers with unit norm and both real and imaginary parts rational numbers
- Circular algebraic curve – Plane algebraic curve
- Circular distribution – Type of probability distribution
- Circular statistics – Subdiscipline of statistics
- Mean of circular quantities – Method for calculating average values
- Polygon-circle graph – Intersection graph of convex polygons whose vertices lie on a common circle
- Splitting circle method – Root-finding algorithm for polynomials
- von Mises distribution – Probability distribution on the circle
- Wigner semicircle distribution – Probability distribution
- Wrapped distribution – Probability distribution on a hypersphere
  - Wrapped Cauchy distribution – Wrapped probability distribution
  - Wrapped normal distribution

Other topics

- Thomas Baxter (mathematician)

== Physical sciences and engineering ==
- Centrifugal force – Type of inertial force
- Centripetal force – Force directed to the center of rotation
- Circle of confusion – Blurry region in optics
- Circle of forces – Diagram of tire forces in vehicle dynamics
- Circular dichroism – Dichroism with circularly polarized light
- Circular orbit – Orbit with a fixed distance from the barycenter
- Mohr's circle – Geometric civil engineering calculation technique
- Non-uniform circular motion – Object movement along a circular path
- Thomson problem – Arrangement of points on a sphere
- Uniform circular motion – Object movement along a circular path

== Geography ==
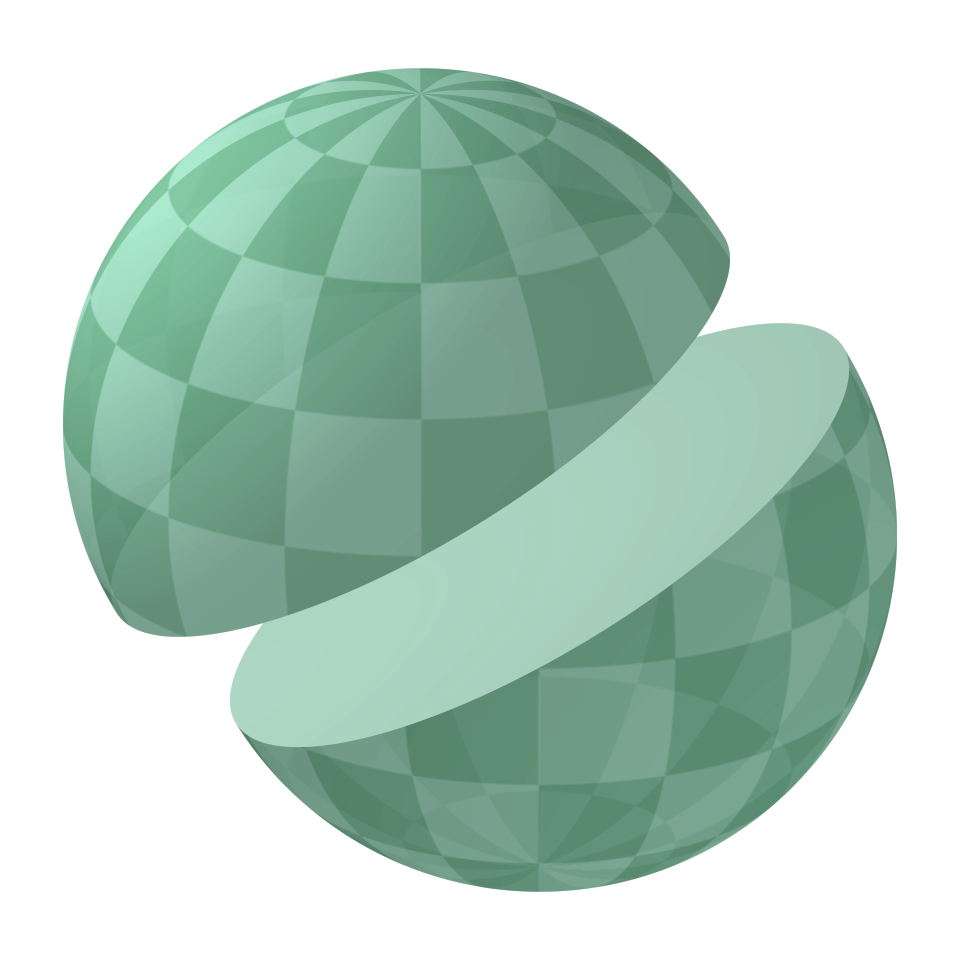
A great circle on a sphere

- Circle of latitude – Geographic notion
  - List of circles of latitude
  - Polar circle – Circle of latitude
    - Arctic Circle – Boundary of the Arctic
    - Antarctic Circle – Boundary of the Antarctic
  - Equator – Imaginary line halfway between Earth's North and South poles
  - Tropic of Cancer – Line of northernmost latitude at which the Sun can be directly overhead
  - Tropic of Capricorn – Line of southernmost latitude at which the Sun can be directly overhead
- Great-circle distance – Shortest distance between two points on the surface of a sphere
- Position circle

== Artifacts ==
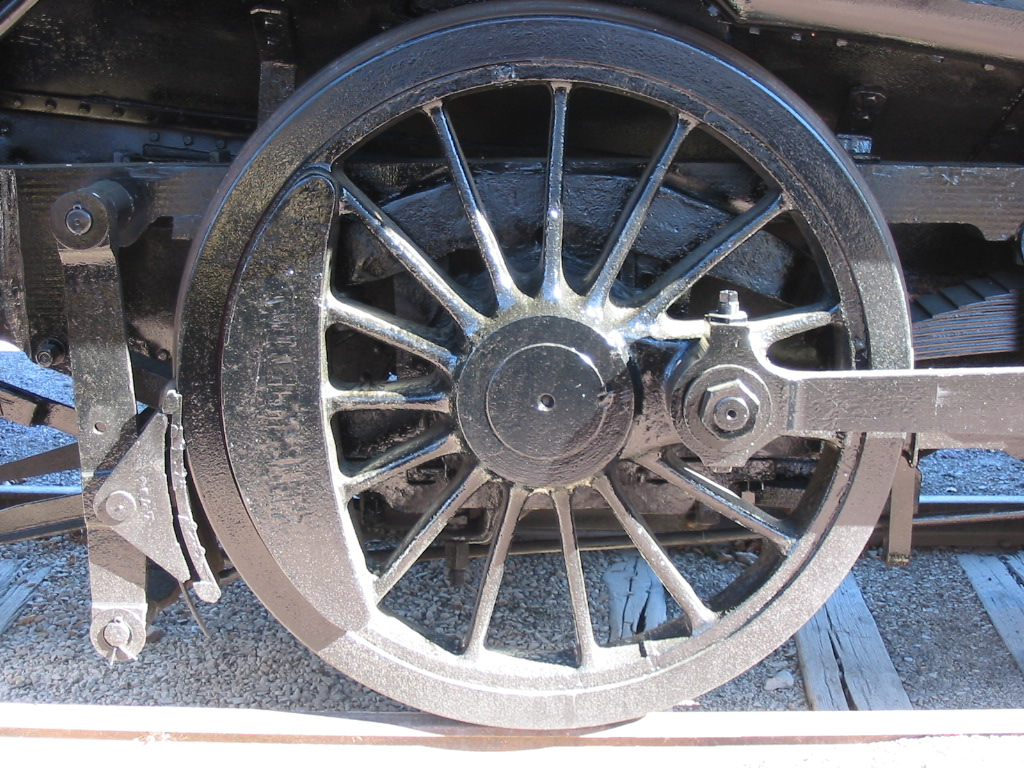
A driving wheel on a steam locomotive.

- Addendum circle
- Belt problem – Mathematics problem
- Center pivot irrigation – Method of crop irrigation
- Circular ditches – Neolithic earthworks
- Circular slide rule – Mechanical analog computer
- Compass (drafting) – Drafting instrument
- Crop circle – Pattern in a crop field
- Dip circle – Instrument used for surveying, prospecting and demonstrating geomagnetism
- List of gear nomenclature
- Peaucellier–Lipkin linkage – Mechanical linkage transforming rotary motion into linear
- Pitch circle
- Repeating circle – Type of angular measurement instrument
- Timber circle – Rings of upright wooden posts
- Traffic circle – Traffic intersection
- Setting circles – Astronomy device for a telescope
- Stone circle – Ring of standing stones
- Wheel

== Glyphs and symbols ==
- Borromean rings – Three linked but pairwise separated rings
- Circled dot (disambiguation) – Graphic and typographic symbol
- Circles in Polish mythology
- Crescent – Symbol of a lunar phase
- Dotted circle – Non-significant typographic character
- Ensō – Japanese motif
- Magic circle – Protective device in ritual magic
- Olympic emblem – Symbols of the Olympic Games
- Ouroboros – Symbolic serpent with its tail in its mouth
- Petosiris to Nechepso – Hellenistic astrologers
- Quatrefoil – Artistic representation of four circular leaf shapes used in architecture
- Ring (diacritic) – Diacritic sign
- Roundel – Circular disc used as a symbol
- Sacred Chao – Belief system based around the Greek goddess Eris
- Shield of the Trinity – Visual symbol expressing the Christian Trinity
- Solar symbols
- Squared-circle postmark – Postal marking
- Sun cross – Circle containing four or more spokes
- Symbol of Tanit – Goddess of Carthage
- Trefoil – Artistic representation of three circular leaf shapes used in architecture
- Triquetra – Triangular motif formed of three interlaced arcs or loops
- Vesica piscis – Shape that is the intersection of two circles with the same radius
- Triple Goddess symbol – Triunity of deities in Neopaganism
- Yin and yang

== See also ==
- List of specially named circles – Simple curve of Euclidean geometry
- Circle (disambiguation)
- Circle symbol
- Wandering in circles
