= Archimedean circle =

Circle in the arbelos congruent to the twin circles

Archimedes' twin circles. The large semicircle has unit diameter, BC = 1–r, and AB = r = AB/AC.

In geometry, an Archimedean circle is any circle constructed from an arbelos that has the same radius as each of Archimedes' twin circles. If the arbelos is normed such that the diameter of its outer (largest) half circle has a length of 1 and r denotes the radius of any of the inner half circles, then the radius ρ of such an Archimedean circle is given by

$$\rho=\frac{1}{2}r\left(1-r\right),$$

There are over fifty different known ways to construct Archimedean circles.

== Origin ==
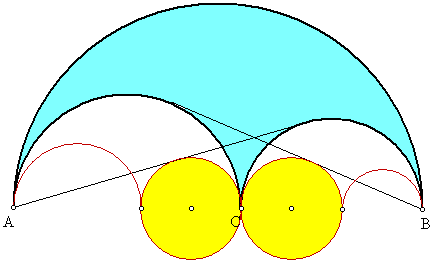
Example of two Archimedean circles

An Archimedean circle was first constructed by Archimedes in his Book of Lemmas. In his book, he constructed what is now known as Archimedes' twin circles.

=== Radius ===
If $a$ and $b$ are the radii of the small semicircles of the arbelos, the radius of an Archimedean circle is equal to

$$R = \frac{ab}{a+b}$$

This radius is thus $\frac 1R = \frac 1a + \frac 1b$.

The Archimedean circle with center $C$ (as in the figure at right) is tangent to the tangents from the centers of the small semicircles to the other small semicircle.

== Other Archimedean circles finders ==
=== Leon Bankoff ===
Leon Bankoff constructed other Archimedean circles called Bankoff's triplet circle and Bankoff's quadruplet circle.

The Schoch line (cyan line) and examples of Woo circles (green).

=== Thomas Schoch ===
In 1978 Thomas Schoch found a dozen more Archimedean circles (the Schoch circles) that have been published in 1998. He also constructed what is known as the Schoch line.

=== Peter Y. Woo ===
Peter Y. Woo considered the Schoch line, and with it, he was able to create a family of infinitely many Archimedean circles known as the Woo circles.

=== Frank Power ===
In the summer of 1998, Frank Power introduced four more Archimedes circles known as Archimedes' quadruplets.

=== Archimedean circles in Wasan geometry (Japanese geometry) ===
In 1831, Nagata (永田岩三郎遵道) proposed a sangaku problem involving two Archimedean circles, which are denoted by W6 and W7 in [3]. In 1853, Ootoba (大鳥羽源吉守敬) proposed a sangaku problem involving an Archimedean circle.
