= Henry Vuibert =

French mathematician and publisher (1857–1945)

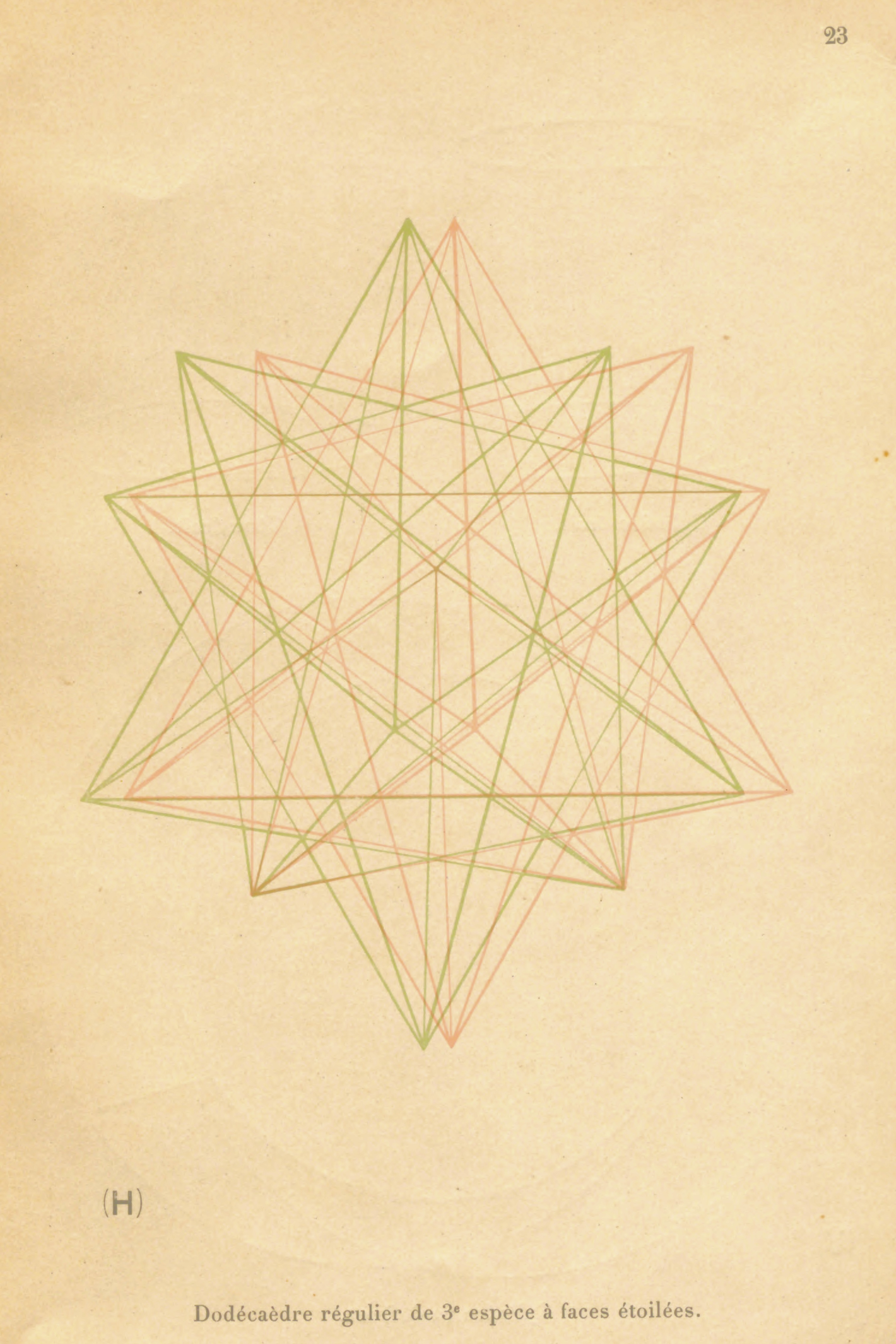
"Dodécaèdre régulier de 3e espèce à faces étoilées" (likely a great icosahedron) from Vuibert's Les Anaglyphes geometriques, meant to be viewed with what are now called 3-D glasses

Désiré-Henry Vuibert (21 August 1857 – 27 November 1945) was a French mathematician and publisher of technical books and journals, and founder of the French publishing house Vuibert. He was a publisher of the same class as Louis Hachette and Pierre Larousse, and is said to have begun his company in 1876.

His book Les Anaglyphes geometriques described "Vuibert's principle of anaglyphic vision" based on a "procedure invented by Louis Ducos du Houron, which consisted in printing, in superimposition, pairs of stereoscopic views, taken in complementary colors". This book and the concepts therein are said to have "inspired Marcel Duchamp's interest in anaglyphs". Les Anaglyphes geometriques "set the standard" for representation of 3D in two dimensions and offered a "grand tour of shape" that influenced both artists and mathematicians alike.

Also, according to one account, it was Vuibert, not Eutaris, who first worked out what is now called a Taylor circle.
