= Circular surface =

In mathematics and, in particular, differential geometry a circular surface is the image of a map ƒ : I × S^{1} → R^{3}, where I ⊂ R is an open interval and S^{1} is the unit circle, defined by

$$f(t,\theta) := \gamma(t) + r(t){\mathbf u}(t)\cos\theta + r(t){\mathbf v}(t)\sin\theta, \,$$

where γ, u, v : I → R^{3} and r : I → R_{>0}, when R_{>0} := { x ∈ R : x > 0 }. Moreover, it is usually assumed that u · u = v · v = 1 and u · v = 0, where dot denotes the canonical scalar product on R^{3}, i.e. u and v are unit length and mutually perpendicular. The map γ : I → R^{3} is called the base curve for the circular surface and the two maps u, v : I → R^{3} are called the direction frame for the circular surface. For a fixed t_{0} ∈ I the image of ƒ(t_{0}, θ) is called a generating circle of the circular surface.

Circular surfaces are an analogue of ruled surfaces. In the case of circular surfaces the generators are circles; called the generating circles. In the case of ruled surface the generators are straight lines; called rulings.
