= Orthoptic =

Orthopic may refer to:

- Orthoptic (geometry), the set of points for which two tangents of a given curve meet at a right angle, a type of isoptic
- Orthoptics, the diagnosis and treatment of defective eye movement and coordination
- A form of eye exercise designed to correct vision

== See also ==
- Orthotopic
