= Leon Bankoff =

American mathematician

Leon Bankoff (December 13, 1908 – February 16, 1997), born in New York City, New York, was an American dentist. As an amateur mathematician he constructed the Bankoff circle. He was also an Esperantist.

== Life ==
The Bankoff Circle

After a visit to the City College of New York, Bankoff studied dentistry at New York University. Later, he moved to Los Angeles, California, where he taught at the University of Southern California; while there, he completed his studies. He practiced over 60 years as a dentist in Beverly Hills. Many of his patients were celebrities.

Along with Bankoff's interest in dentistry were the piano and the guitar. He was fluent in Esperanto, created artistic sculptures, and was interested in the progressive development of computer technology. Above all, he was a specialist in the mathematical world and highly respected as an expert in the field of flat geometry. Since the 1940s, he lectured and published many articles as a co-author. Bankoff collaborated with Paul Erdős in a mathematics paper and therefore has an Erdős number 1.

From 1968 to 1981, Bankoff was the editor of the Problem Department of Pi Mu Epsilon Journals, where he was responsible for the publication of some 300 top problems in the area of plane geometry, particularly Morley's trisector theorem, and the arbelos of Archimedes. Among his discoveries with the arbelos was the Bankoff circle, which is equal in area to Archimedes' twin circles.

== Publications ==
- How Did Pappus Do It? The Mathematical Gardner, David A. Klarner ed. (Pridle, Weber & Schmidt, 1981).
- The Metamorphosis of the Butterfly Theorem, Mathematics Magazine, Mathematical Association of America, October 1987.
- "The Asymmetric Propeller," (with Paul Erdős and Murray S. Klamkin) Mathematics Magazine, 46 (1973), 270-272.
