= Eutaris =

French mathematician

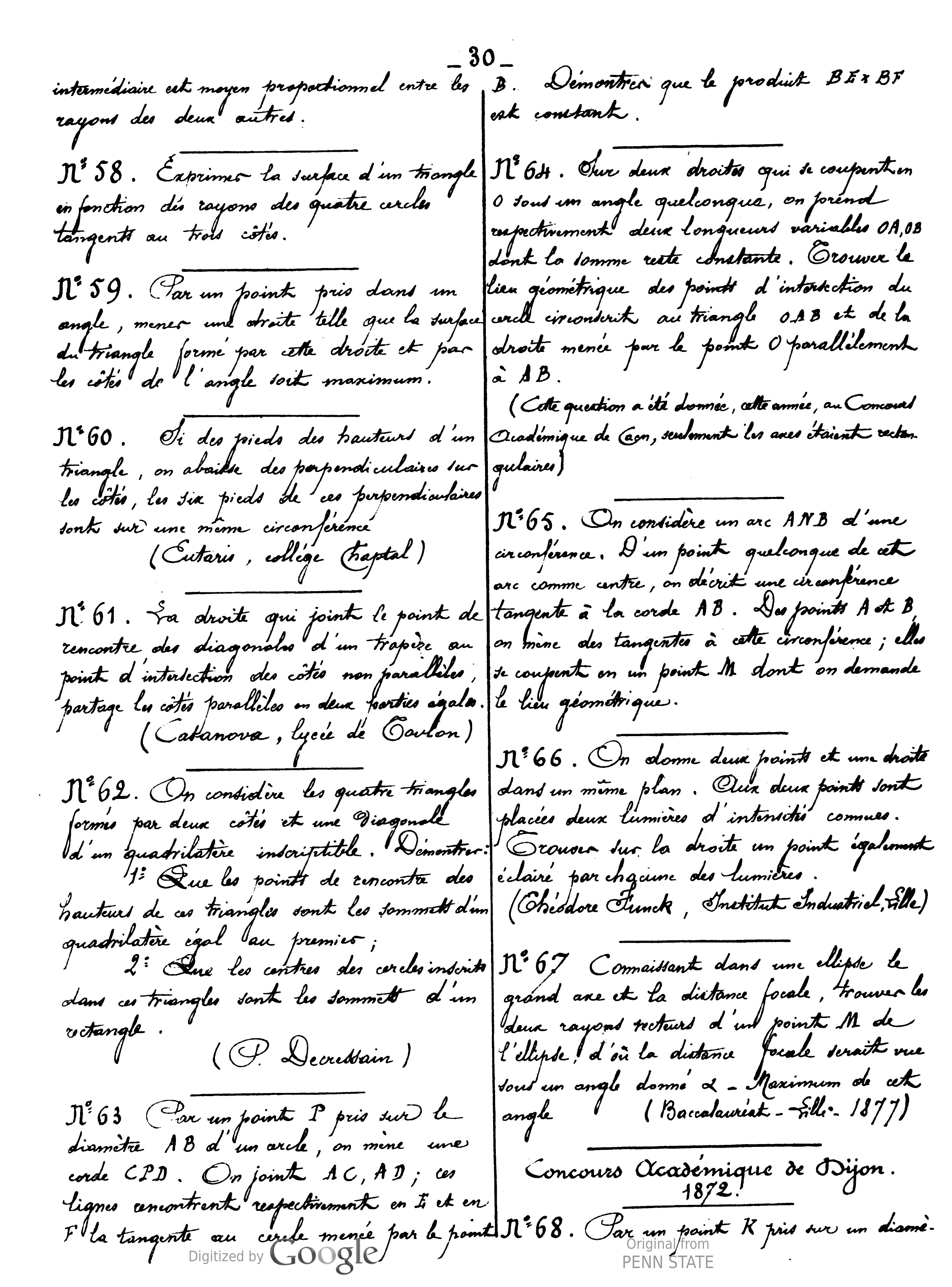
Eutaris in Vuibert's Journal du Mathématiques Alimentaires, November 1877, Vol. II, pp. 30, 43

M. Restiau, also known by the anagramatic pen name Eutaris, was a French mathematician who first postulated what is now known as a Taylor circle.

According to an 1895 article by John Sturgeon Mackay about triangle symmetry, "The property, that the six projections of the vertices of the orthic triangle on the sides of the fundamental triangle are eoncyclic, seems to have been first published in Mr Vuibert's Journal du Mathématiques Alimentaires in November 1877. See Vol. II. pp. 30, 43. It is proposed by Eutaris. This name, as my friend Mr Maurice D'Ocagne informs me, was assumed anagrammatically by M. Restiau, at that time a répétiteur [tutor] in the Collège Chaptal, Paris." An article in L'Intermédiaire des mathématiciens from 1895 adds one biographical detail but also floats a different credit: "Le premier croit que la signature Eutaris était le pseudonyme (par anagramme) de M. Restiau, ancien élève de l'École Polytechnique, répétiteur au Collège Chaptal en 1877; M. Vigarié, au contraire, croit que l'article dont il s'agit avait pour auteur M. Vuibert." A machine translation by Google reads, "The first [J. S. Mackay] believes that the signature Eutaris was the pseudonym (by anagram) of Mr. Restiau, former student of the École Polytechnique, tutor at Collège Chaptal in 1877; Mr. Vigarié, on the contrary, believes that the article in question was authored by Mr. Vuibert."

== See also ==
- Vuibert
