= Van Lamoen circle =

Circle associated with any given triangle

The van Lamoen circle through six circumcenters $A_b$, $A_c$, $B_c$, $B_a$, $C_a$, $C_b$

In Euclidean plane geometry, the van Lamoen circle is a special circle associated with any given triangle $T$. It contains the circumcenters of the six triangles that are defined inside $T$ by its three medians.

Specifically, let $A$, $B$, $C$ be the vertices of $T$, and let $G$ be its centroid (the intersection of its three medians). Let $M_a$, $M_b$, and $M_c$ be the midpoints of the sidelines $BC$, $CA$, and $AB$, respectively. It turns out that the circumcenters of the six triangles $AGM_c$, $BGM_c$, $BGM_a$, $CGM_a$, $CGM_b$, and $AGM_b$ lie on a common circle, which is the van Lamoen circle of $T$.

== History ==
The van Lamoen circle is named after the mathematician Floor van Lamoen who posed it as a problem in 2000. A proof was provided by Kin Y. Li in 2001, and the editors of the Amer. Math. Monthly in 2002.

== Properties ==
The center of the van Lamoen circle is point $X(1153)$ in Clark Kimberling's comprehensive list of triangle centers.

In 2003, Alexey Myakishev and Peter Y. Woo proved that the converse of the theorem is nearly true, in the following sense: let $P$ be any point in the triangle's interior, and $AA'$, $BB'$, and $CC'$ be its cevians, that is, the line segments that connect each vertex to $P$ and are extended until each meets the opposite side. Then the circumcenters of the six triangles $APB'$, $APC'$, $BPC'$, $BPA'$, $CPA'$, and $CPB'$ lie on the same circle if and only if $P$ is the centroid of $T$ or its orthocenter (the intersection of its three altitudes), at which point the six circumcenters degenerate into the three Euler points of the nine-point circle. A simpler proof of this result was given by Nguyen Minh Ha in 2005.

== See also ==
- Parry circle
- Lester circle
