= Schoch line =

The Schoch line (cyan) passes through the point A_{1}.

In geometry, the Schoch line is a line defined from an arbelos and named by Peter Woo after Thomas Schoch, who had studied it in conjunction with the Schoch circles.

== Construction ==
An arbelos is a shape bounded by three mutually-tangent semicircular arcs with collinear endpoints, with the two smaller arcs nested inside the larger one; let the endpoints of these three arcs be (in order along the line containing them) A, B, and C. Let K_{1} and K_{2} be two more arcs, centered at A and C, respectively, with radii AB and CB, so that these two arcs are tangent at B; let K_{3} be the largest of the three arcs of the arbelos. A circle, with the center A_{1}, is then created tangent to the arcs K_{1}, K_{2}, and K_{3}. This circle is congruent with Archimedes' twin circles, making it an Archimedean circle; it is one of the Schoch circles. The Schoch line is perpendicular to the line AC and passes through the point A_{1}. It is also the location of the centers of infinitely many Archimedean circles, e.g. the Woo circles.

== Radius and center of A_{1} ==
If r = AB/AC, and AC = 1, then the radius of A_{1} is

$$\rho=\frac{1}{2}r\left(1-r\right)$$

and the center is

$\left(\frac{1}{2}r\left(-1+3r-2r^2\right)~,~r\left(1-r\right)\sqrt{\left(1+r\right)\left(2-r\right)}\right).$
