= Taylor circle =

Special circle in geometry

The feet of the perpendiculars $P_{ab},P_{ac},P_{ba}, P_{bc},P_{ca},P_{cb}$ lie on a common circle

The Taylor circle is a special circle associated with a triangle. It is named after Henry Martyn Taylor (1842–1927), who discussed it in 1882. However it was already considered by Eugène Charles Catalan in 1879 and first proposed by the French mathematician Eutaris in 1877.

Consider the three feet of the three altitudes of triangle. For each foot of an altitude construct the perpendiculars onto the two other triangles sides. The intersections of those perpendiculars with the triangles sides yield six points and those six points are located on a common circle, the Taylor circle.

The radius of the Taylor circle can be computed by the following formula taking the three angles of a triangle and the radius of its circumcircle:

$$r_T = R\sqrt{\sin^2\alpha\sin^2\beta\sin^2\gamma+\cos^2\alpha\cos^2\beta\cos^2\gamma}$$

== See also ==
- List of circle topics
