= Director circle =

Circle formed by all 90° crossings of tangents of an ellipse or hyperbola

An ellipse, its minimum bounding box, and its director circle.

In geometry, the director circle of an ellipse or hyperbola (also called the orthoptic circle or Fermat–Apollonius circle) is a circle consisting of all points where two perpendicular tangent lines to the ellipse or hyperbola cross each other.

== Properties ==
The director circle of an ellipse circumscribes the minimum bounding box of the ellipse. It has the same center as the ellipse, with radius $\sqrt{a^2 + b^2}$, where $a$ and $b$ are the semi-major axis and semi-minor axis of the ellipse. Additionally, it has the property that, when viewed from any point on the circle, the ellipse spans a right angle.

The director circle of a hyperbola has radius $\sqrt{a^2 - b^2}$, and so, may not exist in the Euclidean plane, but could be a circle with imaginary radius in the complex plane.

The director circle of a circle is a concentric circle having radius $\sqrt{2}$ times the radius of the original circle.

== Generalization ==
More generally, for any collection of points P_{i}, weights w_{i}, and constant C, one can define a circle as the locus of points X such that
$$\sum_i w_i \, d(X,P_i)^2 = C.$$

The director circle of an ellipse is a special case of this more general construction with two points P_{1} and P_{2} at the foci of the ellipse, weights w_{1} = w_{2} = 1, and C equal to the square of the major axis of the ellipse. The Apollonius circle, the locus of points X such that the ratio of distances of X to two foci P_{1} and P_{2} is a fixed constant r, is another special case, with w_{1} = 1, w_{2} = –r^{2}, and C = 0.

== Related constructions ==
In the case of a parabola the director circle degenerates to a straight line, the directrix of the parabola.
