= Book of Lemmas =

Geometric treatise on circles attributed to Archimedes

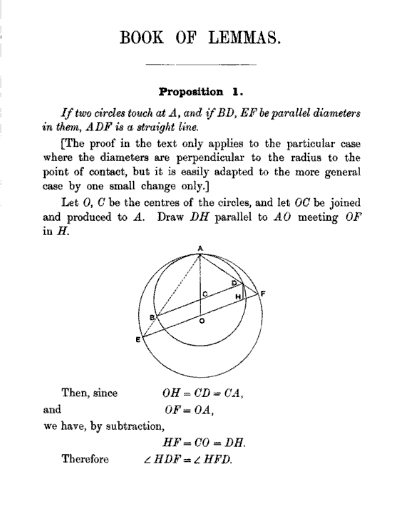
The first page of the Book of Lemmas as seen in The Works of Archimedes (1897).

The Book of Lemmas or Book of Assumptions (Arabic Maʾkhūdhāt Mansūba ilā Arshimīdis) is a book attributed to Archimedes by Thābit ibn Qurra, though the authorship of the book is questionable. It consists of fifteen propositions (lemmas) on circles.

== History ==
=== Translations ===
The Book of Lemmas was first introduced in Arabic by Thābit ibn Qurra; he attributed the work to Archimedes. A translation from Arabic into Latin by John Greaves and revised by Samuel Foster (c. 1650) was published in 1659 as Lemmata Archimedis. Another Latin translation by Abraham Ecchellensis and edited by Giovanni A. Borelli was published in 1661 under the name Liber Assumptorum. T. L. Heath translated Heiburg's Latin work into English in his The Works of Archimedes. A more recently discovered manuscript copy of Thābit ibn Qurra's Arabic translation was translated into English by Emre Coşkun in 2018.

=== Authorship ===
The original authorship of the Book of Lemmas has been in question because in proposition four, the book refers to Archimedes in third person; however, it has been suggested that it may have been added by the translator. Another possibility is that the Book of Lemmas may be a collection of propositions by Archimedes later collected by a Greek writer. Some say its ideas, like the Arbelos, and proofs, especially that of angle trisection in Proposition 8, feel Archimedean in origin. Tannery supposes that if such a work of Archimedes once existed, it must been lost by the time of Pappus, who put similar lemmas in the Collection, calling them, "ancient and from various works".

== New geometrical figures ==
The Book of Lemmas introduces several new geometrical figures.

=== Arbelos ===
The arbelos is the shaded region (grey).

Archimedes first introduced the arbelos (shoemaker's knife) in proposition four of his book:

If AB be the diameter of a semicircle and N any point on AB, and if semicircles be described within the first semicircle and having AN, BN as diameters respectively, the figure included between the circumferences of the three semicircles is "what Archimedes called αρβηλος"; and its area is equal to the circle on PN as diameter, where PN is perpendicular to AB and meets the original semicircle in P.

The figure is used in propositions four through eight. In propositions five, Archimedes introduces the Archimedes's twin circles, and in proposition eight, he makes use what would be the Pappus chain, formally introduced by Pappus of Alexandria.

=== Salinon ===
The salinon is the purple shaded region.

Archimedes first introduced the salinon (salt cellar) in proposition fourteen of his book:

Let ACB be a semicircle on AB as diameter, and let AD, BE be equal lengths measured along AB from A, B respectively. On AD, BE as diameters describe semicircles on the side towards C, and on DE as diameter a semicircle on the opposite side. Let the perpendicular to AB through O, the centre of the first semicircle, meet the opposite semicircles in C, F respectively. Then shall the area of the figure bounded by the circumferences of all the semicircles be equal to the area of the circle on CF as diameter.

Archimedes proved that the salinon and the circle are equal in area.

== Propositions ==
1. If two circles touch at A, and if CD, EF be parallel diameters in them, ADF is a straight line.
2. Let AB be the diameter of a semicircle, and let the tangents to it at B and at any other point D on it meet in T. If now DE be drawn perpendicular to AB, and if AT, DE meet in F, then DF = FE.
3. Let P be any point on a segment of a circle whose base is AB, and let PN be perpendicular to AB. Take D on AB so that AN = ND. If now PQ be an arc equal to the arc PA, and BQ be joined, then BQ, BD shall be equal.
4. If AB be the diameter of a semicircle and N any point on AB, and if semicircles be described within the first semicircle and having AN, BN as diameters respectively, the figure included between the circumferences of the three semicircles is "what Archimedes called αρβηλος"; and its area is equal to the circle on PN as diameter, where PN is perpendicular to AB and meets the original semicircle in P.
5. Let AB be the diameter of a semicircle, C any point on AB, and CD perpendicular to it, and let semicircles be described within the first semicircle and having AC, CB as diameters. Then if two circles be drawn touching CD on different sides and each touching two of the semicircles, the circles so drawn will be equal.
6. Let AB, the diameter of a semicircle, be divided at C so that AC = 3/2 × CB [or in any ratio]. Describe semicircles within the first semicircle and on AC, CB as diameters, and suppose a circle drawn touching the all three semicircles. If GH be the diameter of this circle, to find relation between GH and AB.
7. If circles are circumscribed about and inscribed in a square, the circumscribed circle is double of the inscribed square.
8. If AB be any chord of a circle whose centre is O, and if AB be produced to C so that BC is equal to the radius; if further CO meets the circle in D and be produced to meet the circle the second time in E, the arc AE will be equal to three times the arc BD.
9. If in a circle two chords AB, CD which do not pass through the centre intersect at right angles, then (arc AD) + (arc CB) = (arc AC) + (arc DB).
10. Suppose that TA, TB are two tangents to a circle, while TC cuts it. Let BD be the chord through B parallel to TC, and let AD meet TC in E. Then, if EH be drawn perpendicular to BD, it will bisect it in H.
11. If two chords AB, CD in a circle intersect at right angles in a point O, not being the centre, then AO^{2} + BO^{2} + CO^{2} + DO^{2} = (diameter)^{2}.
12. If AB be the diameter of a semicircle, and TP, TQ the tangents to it from any point T, and if AQ, BP be joined meeting in R, then TR is perpendicular to AB.
13. If a diameter AB of a circle meet any chord CD, not a diameter, in E, and if AM, BN be drawn perpendicular to CD, then CN = DM.
14. Let ACB be a semicircle on AB as diameter, and let AD, BE be equal lengths measured along AB from A, B respectively. On AD, BE as diameters describe semicircles on the side towards C, and on DE as diameter a semicircle on the opposite side. Let the perpendicular to AB through O, the centre of the first semicircle, meet the opposite semicircles in C, F respectively. Then shall the area of the figure bounded by the circumferences of all the semicircles be equal to the area of the circle on CF as diameter.
15. Let AB be the diameter of a circle., AC a side of an inscribed regular pentagon, D the middle point of the arc AC. Join CD and produce it to meet BA produced in E; join AC, DB meeting in F, and Draw FM perpendicular to AB. Then EM = (radius of circle).
