= Metric circle =

Great circle with a characteristic length

In mathematics, a metric circle is the metric space of arc length on a circle, or equivalently on any rectifiable simple closed curve of bounded length. The metric spaces that can be embedded into metric circles can be characterized by a four-point triangle equality.

Some authors have called metric circles Riemannian circles, especially in connection with the filling area conjecture in Riemannian geometry, but this term has also been used for other concepts. A metric circle, defined in this way, is unrelated to and should be distinguished from a metric ball, the subset of a metric space within a given radius from a central point.

== Characterization of subspaces ==
A metric space is a subspace of a metric circle (or of an equivalently defined metric line, interpreted as a degenerate case of a metric circle) if every four of its points can be permuted and labeled as $a,b,c,d$ so that they obey the equalities of distances $D(a,b)+D(b,c)=D(a,c)$ and $D(b,c)+D(c,d)=D(b,d)$. A space with this property has been called a circular metric space.

== Filling ==
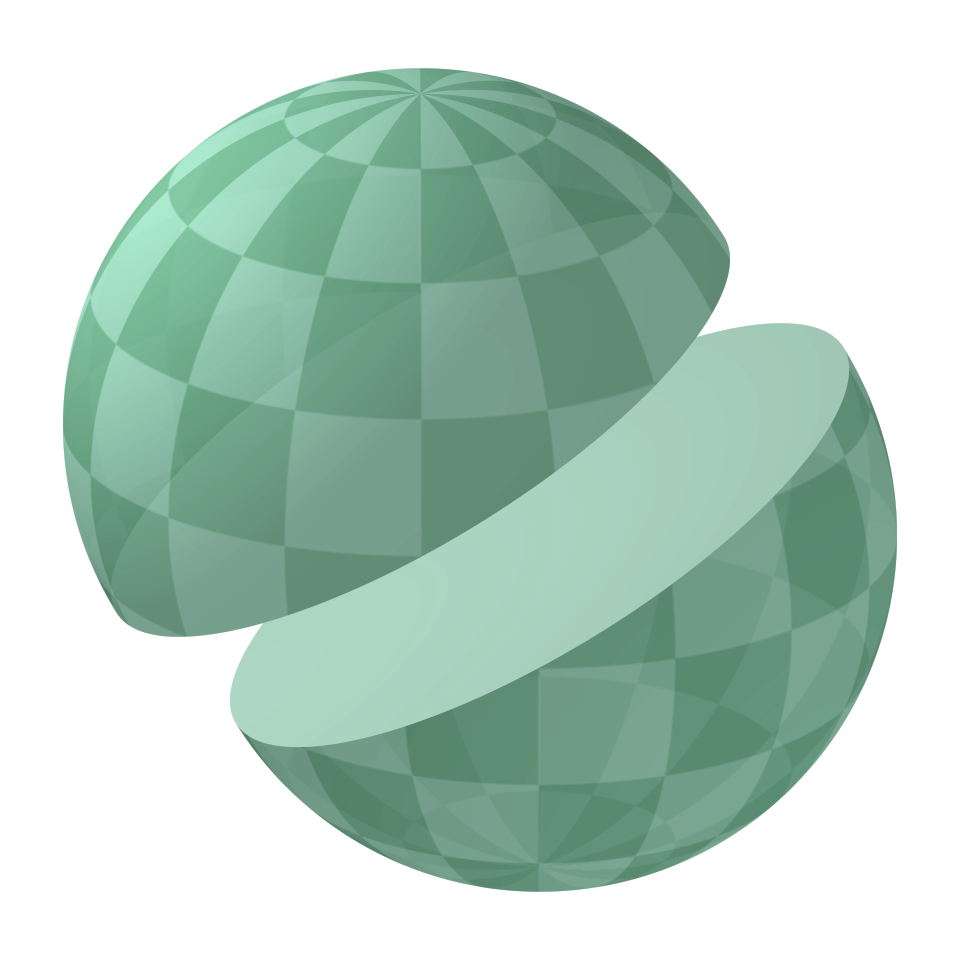
Arc distances on a great circle are the same as the distance between the same points on a sphere, and on the hemispheres into which the circle divides the sphere.

The Riemannian unit circle of length 2π can be embedded, without any change of distance, into the metric of geodesics on a unit sphere, by mapping the circle to a great circle and its metric to great-circle distance. The same metric space would also be obtained from distances on a hemisphere. This differs from the boundary of a unit disk, for which opposite points on the unit disk would have distance 2, instead of their distance π on the Riemannian circle. This difference in internal metrics between the hemisphere and the disk led Mikhael Gromov to pose his filling area conjecture, according to which the unit hemisphere is the minimum-area surface having the Riemannian circle as its boundary.
