= Introduction to Circle Packing =

2005 mathematics text

Introduction to Circle Packing: The Theory of Discrete Analytic Functions
- Author: Kenneth Stephenson
- Language: English
- Genre: Mathematics
- Publisher: Cambridge University Press
- Publication date: 2005
- ISBN: 978-0-521-82356-2
- OCLC: 55878014

Introduction to Circle Packing: The Theory of Discrete Analytic Functions is a mathematical monograph concerning systems of tangent circles and the circle packing theorem. It was written by Kenneth Stephenson and published in 2005 by the Cambridge University Press.

== Topics ==
Circle packings, as studied in this book, are systems of circles that touch at tangent points but do not overlap, according to a combinatorial pattern of adjacencies specifying which pairs of circles should touch. The circle packing theorem states that a circle packing exists if and only if the pattern of adjacencies forms a planar graph; it was originally proved by Paul Koebe in the 1930s, and popularized by William Thurston, who rediscovered it in the 1970s and connected it with the theory of conformal maps and conformal geometry. As a topic, this should be distinguished from sphere packing, which considers higher dimensions (here, everything is two dimensional) and is more focused on packing density than on combinatorial patterns of tangency.

The book is divided into four parts, in progressive levels of difficulty. The first part introduces the subject visually, encouraging the reader to think about packings not just as static objects but as dynamic systems of circles that change in predictable ways when the conditions under which they are formed (their patterns of adjacency) change. The second part concerns the proof of the circle packing theorem itself, and of the associated rigidity theorem: every maximal planar graph can be associated with a circle packing that is unique up to Möbius transformations of the plane. More generally the same result holds for any triangulated manifold, with a circle packing on a topologically equivalent Riemann surface that is unique up to conformal equivalence.

The third part of the book concerns the degrees of freedom that arise when the pattern of adjacencies is not fully triangulated (it is a planar graph, but not a maximal planar graph). In this case, different extensions of this pattern to larger maximal planar graphs will lead to different packings, which can be mapped to each other by corresponding circles. The book explores the connection between these mappings, which it calls discrete analytic functions, and the analytic functions of classical mathematical analysis. The final part of the book concerns a conjecture of William Thurston, proved by Burton Rodin and Dennis Sullivan, that makes this analogy concrete: conformal mappings from any topological disk to a circle can be approximated by filling the disk by a hexagonal packing of unit circles, finding a circle packing that adds to that pattern of adjacencies a single outer circle, and constructing the resulting discrete analytic function. This part also includes applications to number theory and the visualization of brain structure.

Stephenson has implemented algorithms for circle packing and used them to construct the many illustrations of the book, giving to much of this work the flavor of experimental mathematics, although it is also mathematically rigorous. Unsolved problems are listed throughout the book, which also includes nine appendices on related topics such as the ring lemma and Doyle spirals.

== Audience and reception ==
The book presents research-level mathematics, and is aimed at professional mathematicians interested in this and related topics. Reviewer Frédéric Mathéus describes the level of the material in the book as "both mathematically rigorous and accessible to the novice mathematician", presented in an approachable style that conveys the author's love of the material. However, although the preface to the book states that no background knowledge is necessary, and that the book can be read by non-mathematicians or used as an undergraduate textbook, reviewer Michele Intermont disagrees, noting that it has no exercises for students and writing that "non-mathematicians will be nothing other than frustrated with this book". Similarly, reviewer David Mumford finds the first seven chapters (part I and much of part II) to be at an undergraduate level, but writes that "as a whole, the book is suitable for graduate students in math".

== Publication ==
- Stephenson, Kenneth (2005), Introduction to circle packing: the theory of discrete analytic functions, New York: Cambridge University Press, ISBN 9780521823562, OCLC 55878014
