= Belt problem =

Mathematics problem

The belt problem

The belt problem is a mathematics problem which requires finding the length of a crossed belt that connects two circular pulleys with radius r_{1} and r_{2} whose centers are separated by a distance P. The solution of the belt problem requires trigonometry and the concepts of the bitangent line, the vertical angle, and congruent angles.

== Solution ==
Clearly triangles ACO and ADO are congruent right angled triangles, as are triangles BEO and BFO. In addition, triangles ACO and BEO are similar. Therefore angles CAO, DAO, EBO and FBO are all equal. Denoting this angle by $\varphi$ (denominated in radians), the length of the belt is

$$CO + DO + EO + FO + \text {arc} CD + \text {arc} EF \,\!$$

$$=2r_1\tan(\varphi) + 2r_2\tan(\varphi) + (2\pi-2\varphi)r_1 + (2\pi-2\varphi)r_2 \,\!$$

$$=2(r_1+r_2)(\tan(\varphi) + \pi- \varphi) \,\!$$

This exploits the convenience of denominating angles in radians that the length of an arc = the radius × the measure of the angle facing the arc.

To find $\varphi$ we see from the similarity of triangles ACO and BEO that

$$\frac{AO}{BO} = \frac{AC}{BE} \,\!$$

$$\Rightarrow \frac{P-x}{x} = \frac{r_1}{r_2} \,\!$$

$$\Rightarrow \frac{P}{x} = \frac{r_1+r_2}{r_2} \,\!$$

$$\Rightarrow {x} = \frac{P r_2}{r_1+r_2} \,\!$$

$$\cos(\varphi) = \frac{r_2}{x} = \frac{r_2}{\left(\dfrac{P r_2}{r_1+r_2}\right)} = \frac{r_1+r_2}{P} \,\!$$

$$\Rightarrow \varphi=\arccos\left(\frac{r_1+r_2}{P}\right) \,\!$$

For fixed P the length of the belt depends only on the sum of the radius values r_{1} + r_{2}, and not on their individual values.

== Pulley problem ==
The pulley problem

There are other types of problems similar to the belt problem. The pulley problem, as shown, is similar to the belt problem; however, the belt does not cross itself. In the pulley problem the length of the belt is

$$2 P \sin\left(\frac{\theta}{2}\right)+r_1(2\pi-\theta)+r_2{\theta}\, ,$$

where r_{1} represents the radius of the larger pulley, r_{2} represents the radius of the smaller one, and:

$$\theta=2\arccos\left(\frac{r_1-r_2}{P}\right)\, .$$

== Applications ==
The belt problem is used in the design of aeroplanes, bicycle gearing, cars, and other items with pulleys or belts that cross each other. The pulley problem is also used in the design of conveyor belts found in airport luggage belts and automated factory lines.

== See also ==
- Tangent lines to circles
