= Bankoff circle =

Circle constructed from an arbelos

A Bankoff circle with the center C''_{6}

In geometry, the Bankoff circle or Bankoff triplet circle is a certain Archimedean circle that can be constructed from an arbelos; an Archimedean circle is any circle with area equal to each of Archimedes' twin circles. The Bankoff circle was first constructed by Leon Bankoff in 1974.

== Construction ==
The Bankoff circle is formed from three semicircles that create an arbelos. A circle C_{1} is then formed tangent to each of the three semicircles, as an instance of the problem of Apollonius. Another circle C_{2} is then created, through three points: the two points of tangency of C_{1} with the smaller two semicircles, and the point where the two smaller semicircles are tangent to each other. C_{2} is the Bankoff circle.

== Radius of the circle ==
If r = AB/AC, then the radius of the Bankoff circle is:

$$R=\frac{1}{2}r\left(1-r\right).$$
