= Lester's theorem =

Several points associated with a scalene triangle lie on the same circle

The Fermat points $X_{13},X_{14}$, the center $X_5$ of the nine-point circle (light blue), and the circumcenter $X_3$ of the green triangle lie on the Lester circle (black).

In Euclidean plane geometry, Lester's theorem states that in any scalene triangle, the two Fermat points, the nine-point center, and the circumcenter lie on the same circle. The result is named after June Lester, who published it in 1997, and the circle through these points was called the Lester circle by Clark Kimberling. Lester proved the result by using the properties of complex numbers; subsequent authors have given elementary proofs, proofs using vector arithmetic, and computerized proofs. The center of the Lester circle is also a triangle center. It is the center designated as X(1116) in the Encyclopedia of Triangle Centers. Recently, Peter Moses discovered 21 other triangle centers lie on the Lester circle. The points are numbered X(15535) – X(15555) in the Encyclopedia of Triangle Centers.

== Gibert's generalization ==
In 2000, Bernard Gibert proposed a generalization of the Lester Theorem involving the Kiepert hyperbola of a triangle. His result can be stated as follows: Every circle with a diameter that is a chord of the Kiepert hyperbola and perpendicular to the triangle's Euler line passes through the Fermat points.

== See also ==
- Parry circle
- Shape § Similarity classes
- van Lamoen circle
