= Arbelos =

Plane region bounded by three semicircles

An arbelos (grey region)

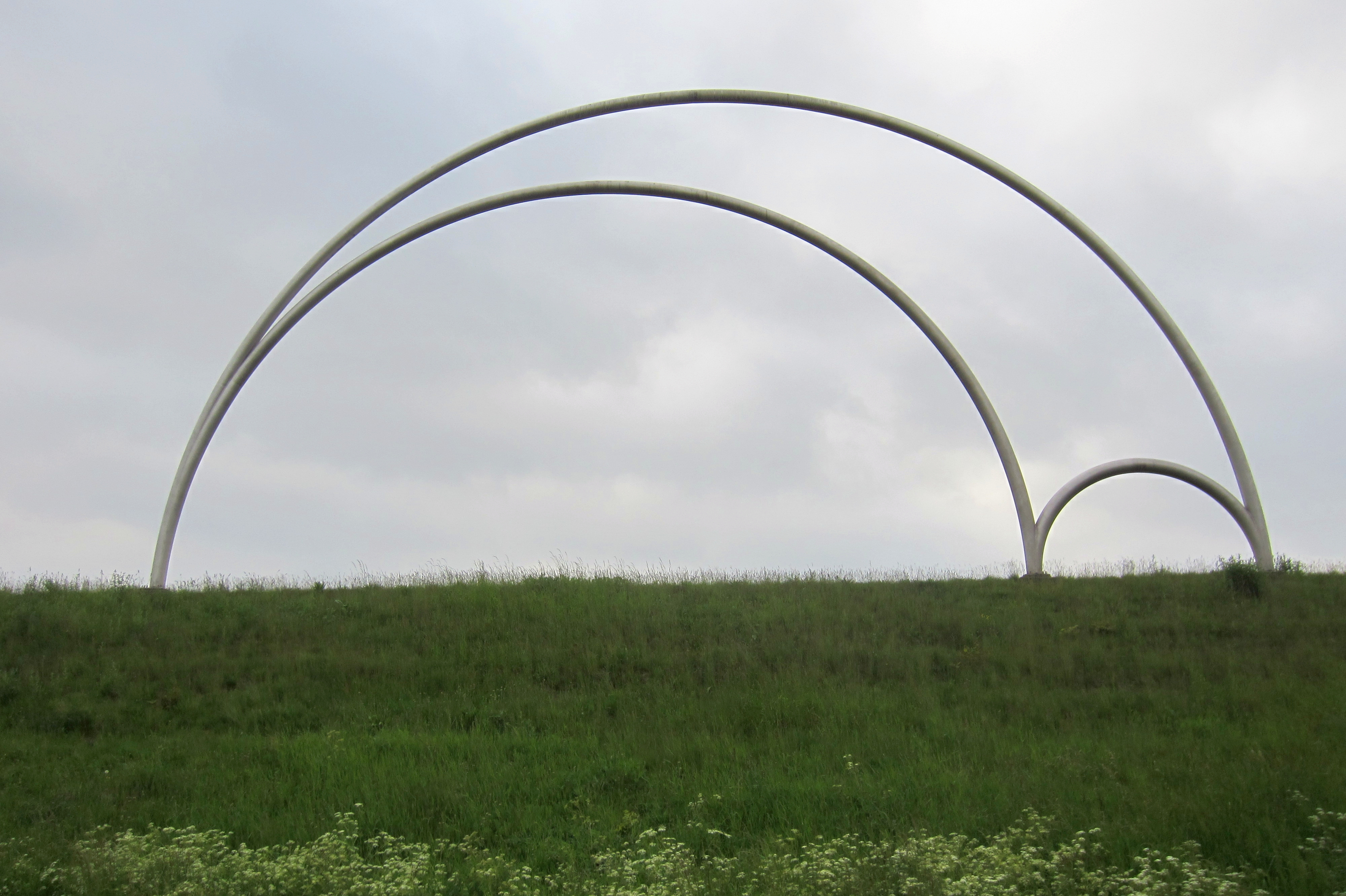
Arbelos sculpture in Kaatsheuvel, Netherlands

In geometry, an arbelos is a plane region bounded by three semicircles with three apexes such that each corner of each semicircle is shared with one of the others (connected), all on the same side of a straight line (the baseline) that contains their diameters.

The earliest known reference to this figure is in Archimedes's Book of Lemmas, where some of its mathematical properties are stated as Propositions 4 through 8. The word arbelos is Greek for 'shoemaker's knife'. The figure is closely related to the Pappus chain.

== Properties ==
Two of the semicircles are necessarily concave, with arbitrary diameters a and b; the third semicircle is convex, with diameter a+b. Let the diameters of the smaller semicircles be B̅A̅ and A̅C̅; then the diameter of the larger semircle is B̅C̅.

Some special points on the arbelos.

=== Area ===
Let H be the intersection of the larger semicircle with the line perpendicular to BC at A. Then the area of the arbelos is equal to the area of a circle with diameter H̅A̅.

Proof: For the proof, reflect the arbelos over the line through the points B and C, and observe that twice the area of the arbelos is what remains when the areas of the two smaller circles (with diameters B̅A̅, A̅C̅) are subtracted from the area of the large circle (with diameter B̅C̅). Since the area of a circle is proportional to the square of the diameter (Euclid's Elements, Book XII, Proposition 2; we do not need to know that the constant of proportionality is π/4), the problem reduces to showing that $2|AH|^2 = |BC|^2 - |AC|^2 - |BA|^2$. The length |BC| equals the sum of the lengths |BA| and |AC|, so this equation simplifies algebraically to the statement that $|AH|^2 = |BA||AC|$. Thus the claim is that the length of the segment A̅H̅ is the geometric mean of the lengths of the segments B̅A̅ and A̅C̅. Now (see Figure) the triangle BHC, being inscribed in the semicircle, has a right angle at the point H (Euclid, Book III, Proposition 31), and consequently |HA| is indeed a "mean proportional" between |BA| and |AC| (Euclid, Book VI, Proposition 8, Porism). This proof approximates the ancient Greek argument; Harold P. Boas cites a paper of Roger B. Nelsen who implemented the idea as the following proof without words.

=== Rectangle ===
Let D and E be the points where the segments B̅H̅ and C̅H̅ intersect the semicircles AB and AC, respectively. The quadrilateral ADHE is actually a rectangle.

Proof: ∠BDA, ∠BHC, and ∠AEC are right angles because they are inscribed in semicircles (by Thales's theorem). The quadrilateral ADHE therefore has three right angles, so it is a rectangle. Q.E.D.

=== Tangents ===
The line DE is tangent to semicircle BA at D and semicircle AC at E.

Proof: Since ADHE is a rectangle, the diagonals AH and DE have equal length and bisect each other at their intersection O. Therefore, $|OD| = |OA| = |OE|$. Also, since O̅A̅ is perpendicular to the diameters B̅A̅ and A̅C̅, O̅A̅ is tangent to both semicircles at the point A. Finally, because the two tangents to a circle from any given exterior point have equal length, it follows that the other tangents from O to semicircles BA and AC are O̅D̅ and O̅E̅ respectively.

=== Archimedes' circles ===
The altitude AH divides the arbelos into two regions, each bounded by a semicircle, a straight line segment, and an arc of the outer semicircle. The circles inscribed in each of these regions, known as the Archimedes' circles of the arbelos, have the same size.

== Variations and generalisations ==
example of an f-belos

The parbelos is a figure similar to the arbelos, that uses parabola segments instead of half circles. A generalisation comprising both arbelos and parbelos is the f-belos, which uses a certain type of similar differentiable functions.

In the Poincaré half-plane model of the hyperbolic plane, an arbelos models an ideal triangle.

== Etymology ==
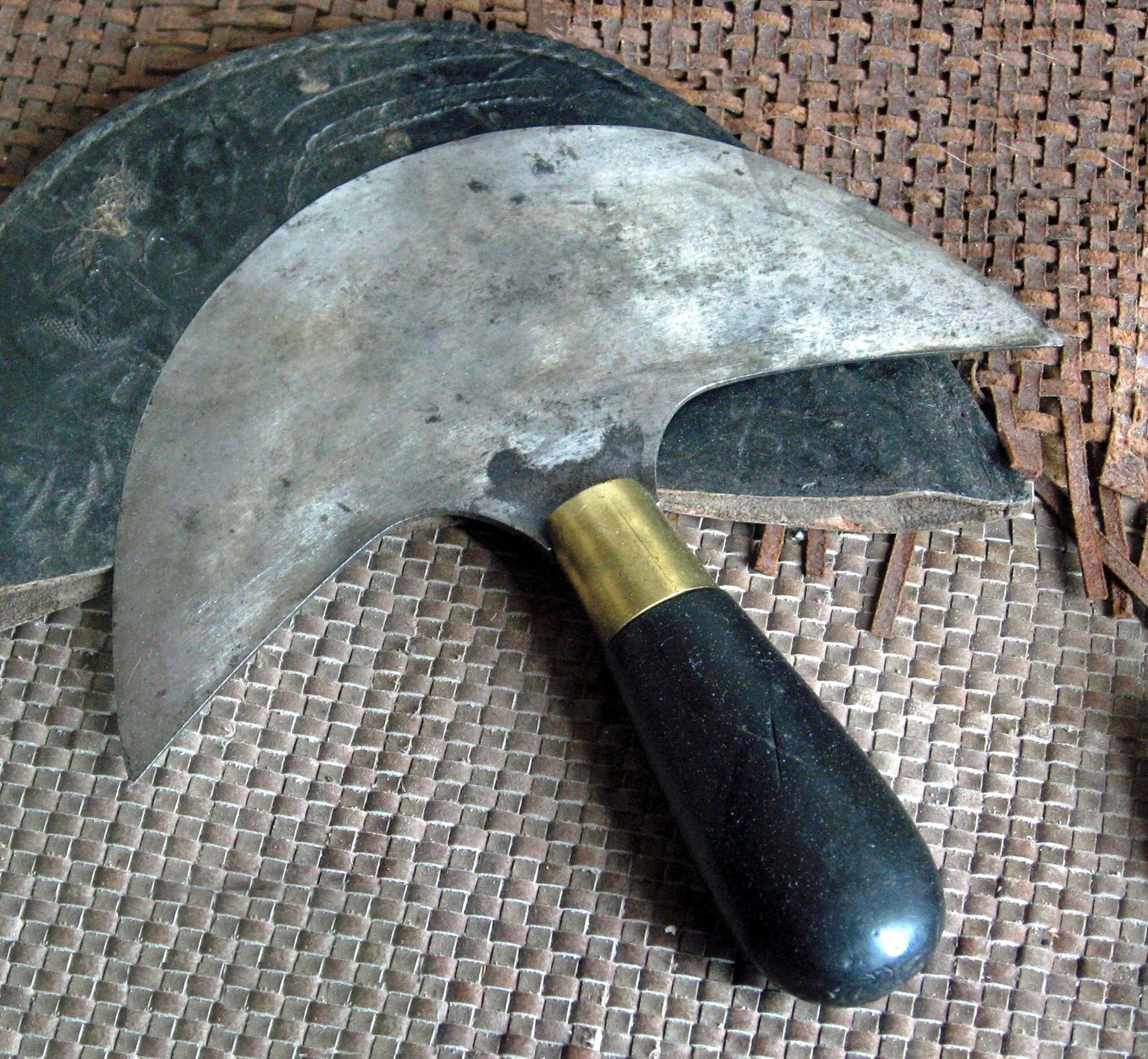
The type of shoemaker's knife that gave its name to the figure

The name arbelos comes from Greek ἡ ἄρβηλος (he árbēlos) or ἄρβυλος árbylos, meaning "shoemaker's knife", a knife used by cobblers from antiquity to the current day, whose blade is said to resemble the geometric figure.

== See also ==
- Archimedes' quadruplets
- Bankoff circle
- Schoch circles
- Schoch line
- Woo circles
- Pappus chain
- Salinon

== Bibliography ==
- Johnson, R. A. (1929). "The arbelos". Modern Geometry: An elementary treatise on the geometry of the triangle and the circle. Houghton Mifflin. pp. 116–117.
- Ogilvy, C. S. (1969). Excursions in Geometry. Oxford University Press. pp. 51–54.
- Sondow, J. (2013). "The parbelos, a parabolic analog of the arbelos". American Mathematical Monthly. 120 (10): 929–935. arXiv:1210.2279. doi:10.4169/amer.math.monthly.120.10.929. JSTOR 10.4169/amer.math.monthly.120.10.929.
- Wells, D. (1991). The Penguin Dictionary of Curious and Interesting Geometry. New York: Penguin Books. pp. 5–6. ISBN 0-14-011813-6.
