= Unit circle =

Circle with radius of one

Illustration of a unit circle. The variable t is an angle measure.

Animation of the act of unrolling the circumference of a unit circle, a circle with radius of 1. Since C = 2πr, the circumference of a unit circle is 2π.

In mathematics, a unit circle is a circle of unit radius—that is, a radius of 1. Frequently, especially in trigonometry, the unit circle is the circle of radius 1 centered at the origin (0, 0) in the Cartesian coordinate system in the Euclidean plane. In topology, it is often denoted as S^{1} because it is a one-dimensional unit n-sphere. (Note: For further discussion, see the technical distinction between a circle and a disk.)

If (x, y) is a point on the unit circle's circumference, then |x| and |y| are the lengths of the legs of a right triangle whose hypotenuse has length 1. Thus, by the Pythagorean theorem, x and y satisfy the equation $x^2 + y^2 = 1.$

Since x^{2} = (−x)^{2} for all x, and since the reflection of any point on the unit circle about the x- or y-axis is also on the unit circle, the above equation holds for all points (x, y) on the unit circle, not only those in the first quadrant.

The interior of the unit circle is called the open unit disk, while the interior of the unit circle combined with the unit circle itself is called the closed unit disk.

One may also use other notions of "distance" to define other "unit circles", such as the Riemannian circle; see the article on mathematical norms for additional examples.

== In the complex plane ==
Animation of the unit circle with angles

In the complex plane, numbers of magnitude one are called the unit complex numbers. This is the set of complex numbers z such that $|z| = 1.$ When broken into real and imaginary components $z = x + iy,$ this condition is $|z|^2 = z\bar{z} = x^2 + y^2 = 1.$

The complex unit circle can be parametrized by angle measure $\theta$ from the positive real axis using the complex exponential function, $z = e^{i\theta} = \cos \theta + i \sin \theta.$ (See Euler's formula.)

Under the complex multiplication operation, the unit complex numbers form a group called the circle group, usually denoted $\mathbb{T}.$ In quantum mechanics, a unit complex number is called a phase factor.

== Trigonometric functions on the unit circle ==
All of the trigonometric functions of the angle θ (theta) can be constructed geometrically in terms of a unit circle centered at O.

Sine function on unit circle (top) and its graph (bottom)

The trigonometric functions cosine and sine of angle θ are defined using the unit circle.

In this geometric construction, the angle θ is formed by two rays: the initial arm, which remains fixed along the positive x-axis, and the terminal arm, a ray extending from the origin to a point (x, y) on the circumference of the unit circle. The value of θ represents the measure of rotation from the initial arm to the terminal arm, where counterclockwise rotation is designated as positive and clockwise rotation as negative. Consequently, the trigonometric functions are defined by the coordinates of the point where the terminal arm intersects the circle:
$$\cos \theta = x \quad\text{and}\quad \sin \theta = y.$$

The equation x^{2} + y^{2} = 1 gives the relation
$$\cos^2\theta + \sin^2\theta = 1.$$

The unit circle also demonstrates that sine and cosine are periodic functions, with the identities
$$\cos \theta = \cos(2\pi k+\theta)$$
$$\sin \theta = \sin(2\pi k+\theta)$$
for any integer k.

Triangles constructed on the unit circle can also be used to illustrate the periodicity of the trigonometric functions. First, construct a radius OP from the origin O to a point P(x_{1},y_{1}) on the unit circle such that an angle t with 0 < t < π/2 is formed with the positive arm of the x-axis. Now consider a point Q(x_{1},0) and line segments PQ ⊥ OQ. The result is a right triangle △OPQ with ∠QOP = t. Because PQ has length y_{1}, OQ length x_{1}, and OP has length 1 as a radius on the unit circle, sin(t) = y_{1} and cos(t) = x_{1}. Having established these equivalences, take another radius OR from the origin to a point R(−x_{1},y_{1}) on the circle such that the same angle t is formed with the negative arm of the x-axis. Now consider a point S(−x_{1},0) and line segments RS ⊥ OS. The result is a right triangle △ORS with ∠SOR = t. It can hence be seen that, because ∠ROQ = π − t, R is at (cos(π − t), sin(π − t)) in the same way that P is at (cos(t), sin(t)). The conclusion is that, since (−x_{1}, y_{1}) is the same as (cos(π − t), sin(π − t)) and (x_{1},y_{1}) is the same as (cos(t),sin(t)), it is true that sin(t) = sin(π − t) and −cos(t) = cos(π − t). It may be inferred in a similar manner that tan(π − t) = −tan(t), since tan(t) = y_{1}/x_{1} and tan(π − t) = y_{1}/(−x_{1}). A simple demonstration of the above can be seen in the equality sin(π/4) = sin(3π/4) = 1/√2.

When working with right triangles, sine, cosine, and other trigonometric functions only make sense for angle measures more than zero and less than π/2. However, when defined with the unit circle, these functions produce meaningful values for any real-valued angle measure – even those greater than 2π. In fact, all six standard trigonometric functions – sine, cosine, tangent, cotangent, secant, and cosecant, as well as archaic functions like versine and exsecant – can be defined geometrically in terms of a unit circle, as shown at right.

Using the unit circle, the values of any trigonometric function for many angles other than those labeled can be easily calculated by hand using the angle sum and difference formulas.

The unit circle, showing coordinates of certain points

== Complex dynamics ==
Unit circle in complex dynamics

The Julia set of discrete nonlinear dynamical system with evolution function:
$$f_0(x) = x^2$$
is a unit circle. It is a simplest case so it is widely used in the study of dynamical systems.

== See also ==
- Angle measure
- Pythagorean trigonometric identity
- Riemannian circle
- Radian
- Unit disk
- Unit sphere
- Unit hyperbola
- Unit square
- Turn (angle)
- z-transform
- Smith chart
