= Parry point (triangle) =

Triangle center

In geometry, the Parry point is a special point associated with a plane triangle. It is the triangle center designated X(111) in Clark Kimberling's Encyclopedia of Triangle Centers. The Parry point and Parry circle are named in honour of the English geometer Cyril Parry, who studied them in the early 1990s.

== Parry circle ==
Reference triangle △ABC Circumcircle of △ABC Circles of Apollonius (intersect at the isodynamic points J, K) Parry circle (through J, K and centroid G) The Parry circle intersects the circumcircle at two points: the focus of the Kiepert parabola, and the Parry point.

Let △ABC be a plane triangle. The circle through the centroid and the two isodynamic points of △ABC is called the Parry circle of △ABC. The equation of the Parry circle in barycentric coordinates is

$$3(b^2-c^2)(c^2-a^2)(a^2-b^2)(a^2yz+b^2zx+c^2xy) + (x+y+z)\left( \sum_\text{cyclic} b^2c^2(b^2-c^2)(b^2+c^2-2a^2)x\right) =0$$

The center of the Parry circle is also a triangle center. It is the center designated as X(351) in the Encyclopedia of Triangle Centers. The trilinear coordinates of the center of the Parry circle are

$$a(b^2-c^2)(b^2+c^2-2a^2) :  b(c^2-a^2)(c^2+a^2-2b^2) :  c(a^2-b^2)(a^2+b^2-2c^2)$$

The center of the Parry circle is the centroid (average) of the centers of the three circles of Apollonius, which are collinear on the Lemoine axis. The center also lies on the trilinear polar of the intersection of the Lemoine axis and the line at infinity.

The axes of the Steiner ellipse intersect the Lemoine axis on the Parry circle.

== Parry point ==
The Parry circle and the circumcircle of triangle △ABC intersect in two points. One of them is the focus of the Kiepert parabola of △ABC. The other point of intersection is called the Parry point of △ABC.

The trilinear coordinates of the Parry point are

$$\frac{a}{2a^2-b^2-c^2} : \frac{b}{2b^2-c^2-a^2} : \frac{c}{2c^2-a^2-b^2}$$

The Parry point, the centroid and the Steiner point of △ABC are collinear.

The point of intersection of the Parry circle and the circumcircle of △ABC which is the focus of the Kiepert parabola of △ABC is also a triangle center and it is designated as X(110) in Encyclopedia of Triangle Centers. The trilinear coordinates of this triangle center are

$$\frac{a}{b^2-c^2} : \frac{b}{c^2-a^2} : \frac{c}{a^2-b^2}$$

The focus of the Kiepert parabola, the centroid and the Tarry point of △ABC are collinear.

== See also ==
- Lester circle
