= Woo circles =

Two of infinitely many Woo circles (green) all have the center on the Schoch line (cyan)

In geometry, the Woo circles, introduced by Peter Y. Woo, are a set of infinitely many Archimedean circles.

== Construction ==
Form an arbelos with the two inner semicircles tangent at point C. Let m denote any nonnegative real number. Draw two circles, with radii m times the radii of the smaller two arbelos semicircles, centered on the arbelos ground line, also tangent to each other at point C and with radius m times the radius of the corresponding small arbelos arc. Any circle centered on the Schoch line and externally tangent to the circles is a Woo circle.

== See also ==
- Schoch circles
