= Twin circles =

Two congruent circles within an arbelos

The twin circles (red) of an arbelos (grey)

In geometry, the twin circles are two special circles associated with an arbelos. An arbelos is determined by three collinear points A, B, and C, and is the curvilinear triangular region between the three semicircles that have AB, BC, and AC as their diameters. If the arbelos is partitioned into two smaller regions by a line segment through the middle point of A, B, and C, perpendicular to line ABC, then each of the two twin circles lies within one of these two regions, tangent to its two semicircular sides and to the splitting segment.

These circles first appeared in the Book of Lemmas, which showed (Proposition V) that the two circles are congruent. Thābit ibn Qurra, who translated this book into Arabic, attributed it to Greek mathematician Archimedes. Based on this claim the twin circles, and several other circles in the Arbelos congruent to them, have also been called Archimedes's circles. However, this attribution has been questioned by later scholarship.

== Construction ==
Animation of twin circles for various positions of point B on AC segment

Specifically, let $A$, $B$, and $C$ be the three corners of the arbelos, with $B$ between $A$ and $C$. Let $D$ be the point where the larger semicircle intercepts the line perpendicular to the $AC$ through the point $B$. The segment $BD$ divides the arbelos in two parts. The twin circles are the two circles inscribed in these parts, each tangent to one of the two smaller semicircles, to the segment $BD$, and to the largest semicircle.

Each of the two circles is uniquely determined by its three tangencies. Constructing it is a special case of the Problem of Apollonius.

Alternative approaches to constructing two circles congruent to the twin circles have also been found. These circles have also been called Archimedean circles. They include the Bankoff circle, Schoch circles, and Woo circles.

== Properties ==
Let a and b be the diameters of two inner semicircles, so that the outer semicircle has diameter a + b. The diameter of each twin circle is then

$$d=\frac{ab}{a+b}.$$

Alternatively, if the outer semicircle has unit diameter, and the inner circles have diameters $s$ and $1-s$, the diameter of each twin circle is

$$d=s(1-s). \,$$

The smallest circle that encloses both twin circles has the same area as the arbelos.

== See also ==
- Schoch line
