= Schoch circles =

Archimedean circles constructed by Thomas Schoch

In geometry, the Schoch circles are twelve Archimedean circles constructed by Thomas Schoch.

== History ==
In 1979, Thomas Schoch discovered a dozen new Archimedean circles; he sent his discoveries to Scientific American's "Mathematical Games" editor Martin Gardner. The manuscript was forwarded to Leon Bankoff. Bankoff gave a copy of the manuscript to Professor Clayton Dodge of the University of Maine in 1996. The two were planning to write an article about the Arbelos, in which the Schoch circles would be included; however, Bankoff died the year after.

In 1998, Peter Y. Woo of Biola University published Schoch's findings on his website. By generalizing two of Schoch's circles, Woo discovered an infinite family of Archimedean circles named the Woo circles in 1999.

== Circles ==
Gallery of Schoch's Twelve Circles

Circles a and b

Circles c and d

Circle e

Circles f and g

Circles h

Circles i and j

Circles k and l

== See also ==
- Schoch line
