= Yoshio Mikami =

Japanese mathematician

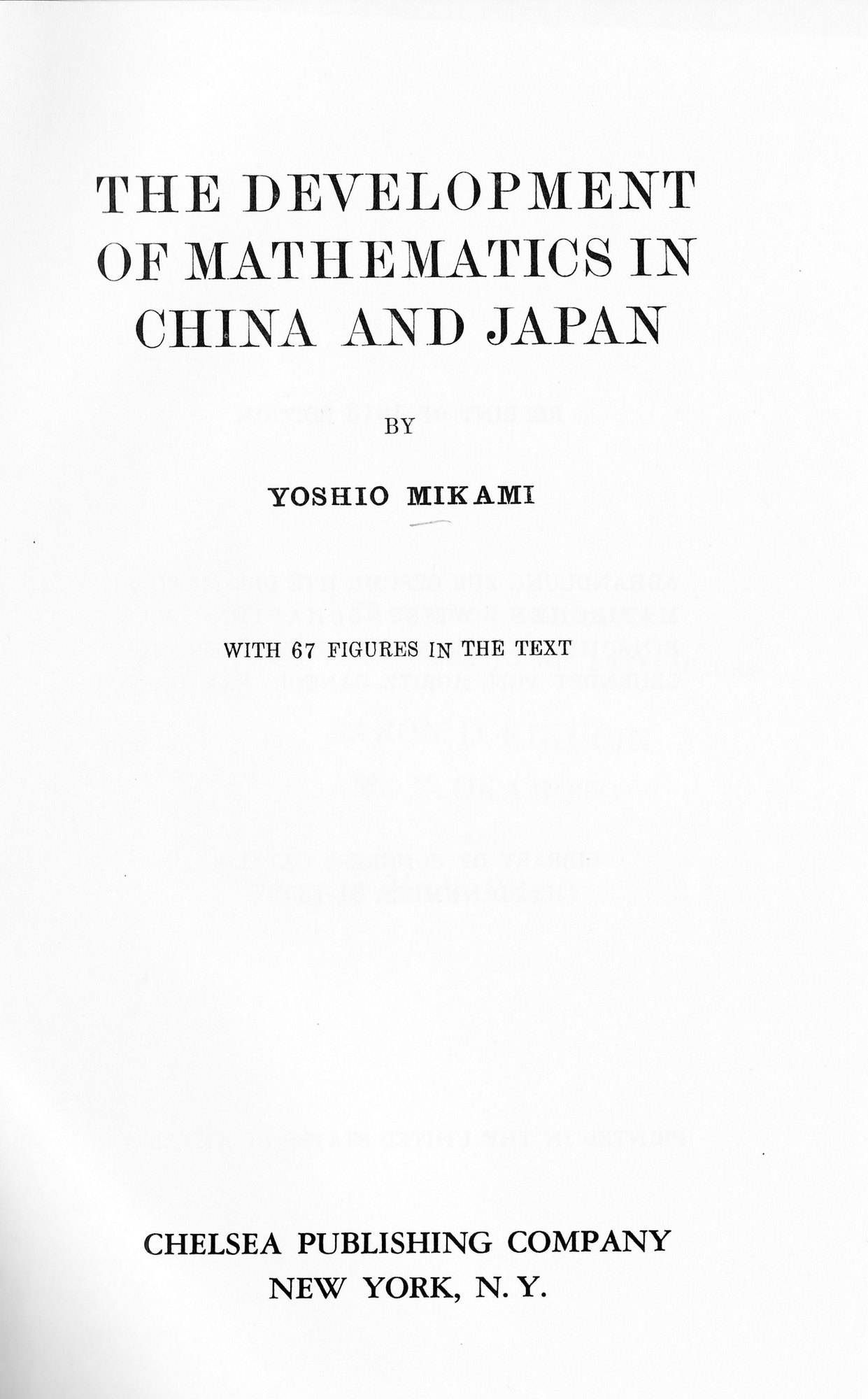

Yoshio Mikami (三上 義夫, Mikami Yoshio; February 16, 1875 – December 31, 1950) was a Japanese mathematician and historian of Japanese mathematics. He was born February 16, 1875, in Kotachi, Hiroshima prefecture. He attended the High School of Tohoku University, and in 1911 was admitted to the Imperial University of Tokyo. He studied history of Japanese and Chinese mathematics. In 1913, he published "The Development of Mathematics in China and Japan" in Leipzig. This book consisted of two parts with 47 chapters. Part one has 21 chapters that describe in depth several important Chinese mathematicians and mathematical classics including Liu Hui, Shen Kuo, Qin Jiushao, Sun Tzu, The Nine Chapters on the Mathematical Art, Mathematical Treatise in Nine Sections, Li Ye, Zhu Shijie and study on π. Part II deals with important wasan mathematicians and their works, including Kambei Mori, Yoshida Koyu, Kowa Seki, Imamura Chisho, Takahara Kisshu, Kurushima, Ajima Chokuyen, Aida Ammei, Shiraishi Chochu, Skabe Kohan, and Hagiwara Teisuke.

He died on December 31, 1950, in Hiroshima.
