= Kambei Mori =

Japanese mathematician

Kambei Mori or Mōri Kambei (毛利 勘兵衛), also known as Mōri Kambei Shigeyoshi Mōri Shigeyoshi (毛利 重能), was a Japanese mathematician in the Edo period.

== Life and work ==
Some 16th-century sources suggest that Mori studied in China, but such claims are inconclusive or rejected by historians. What is known with certainty is that he started a school in Kyoto and he wrote several influential and widely discussed books which dealt with arithmetic and the use of the abacus.

One of his students was Yoshida Mitsuyoshi, the author of Jinkōki, which is the oldest extant Japanese mathematical text.

== Selected works ==
In a statistical overview derived from writings by and about Kambei Mori, OCLC/WorldCat encompasses 2 works in 3 publications in 1 language and 5 library holdings.

- Warisansho (割算書) OCLC 026976775, written division

== See also ==
- Sangaku, the custom of presenting mathematical problems, carved in wood tablets, to the public in shinto shrines
- Soroban, a Japanese abacus
- Japanese mathematics
