= Sakabe Kōhan =

Japanese mathematician

Sakabe Kōhan (坂部 廣胖, 1759 – September 16, 1824) was a Japanese mathematician in the Edo period.

Sakabe served for a time in the Fire Department of the shogunate, but he resigned that position to become a rōnin or masterless samurai. He spent the rest of this life in study, in teaching, and in promoting mathematics education in Japan.

Sakabe was a student of Ajima Naonobu.

Sakabe investigated some European and Chinese works which had appeared in Japan, but his general method was later construed to be innovative, clarified and thus improved. Foreign influence shows itself indirectly some of his published work.

Sakabe's Sampo Tenzan Shinan-roku (Treatise on Tenzan Algebra) in 1810 was the first published work in Japan proposing the use of logarithmic tables. He explained that "these tables save much labor, [but] they are but little known for the reason that they have never been printed in our country." Sakabe's proposal would not be realized until twenty years after his death when the first extensive logarithmic table was published in 1844 by Koide Shuke.

In Sakabe's Treatise on Tenzan Algebra, mathematical problems are arranged in order from easy problems to difficult ones. The text presents a method for finding the length of a circumference and the length an arc of an ellipse. This was the first appearance of the problems pertaining to ellipses in printed books in Japan.

== Selected works ==
In a statistical overview derived from writings by and about Harry Smith Parkes, OCLC/WorldCat encompasses roughly 10+ works in 10+ publications in 1 language and 10+ library holdings.

- 1795 — Shinsen Tetsujutsu
- 1802 — Kaiujutsu-keima (Considerations on the theory of the polygon)
- 1803 — Rippō-eijiku, method for finding cube root
- 1810 — Tenzan Shinan-roku (點竄指南錄) OCLC 22057236896, Treatise on Tenzan Algebra
- 1812 — Kwanki-kodo-shōhō, measurement of spherical arcs and trigonometrical tables
- 1816 — Kairo Anshin-roku (海路安心錄) OCLC 122810576, theory of navigation applying the spherical astronomy of the West

== See also ==
- Sangaku, the custom of presenting mathematical problems, carved in wood tablets, to the public in shinto shrines
- Soroban, a Japanese abacus
- Japanese mathematics
