= Kuro =

Kuro may refer to:

== People with the given name ==
- Hirasawa Kurō (平澤 九朗; 1772–1840), Japanese samurai
- Kuro Tanino (タニノクロウ; born 1976), Japanese theatre director

== Fictional characters ==
- Kuro (One Piece), a character in One Piece
- Kuro Kagami, a character in Kodomo no Jikan
- Kuro Neko, a character in Agustin Guerrero
- Kuro, companion to Toro Inoue
- Kuro, the antagonist of Ori and the Blind Forest

== Places ==
- Kurõ, Estonia, a village
- Mount Kuro (disambiguation)
- Kuroshima (disambiguation) or Kuro Island
- Kuro, Pakistan, a village in Ghanche District, Pakistan

== Other ==
- Kuro (film), a 2012 film
- Pioneer Kuro, a line of televisions by Pioneer Corporation
- "Kuro", an episode of Ao no Exorcist

== See also ==
- Kuuro, American DJ and electronic music producer
- Kuros (disambiguation)
- KuroKy, German-Iranian professional player
- Kuro5hin, discussion website
