= Takebe Kenkō =

Japanese mathematician and cartographer

Takebe Katahiro (建部 賢弘; 1664 – August 24, 1739), also known as Takebe Kenkō, was a Japanese mathematician and cartographer during the Edo period.

== Biography ==
Takebe was the favorite student of the Japanese mathematician Seki Takakazu Takebe is considered to have extended and disseminated Seki's work.

In 1706, Takebe was offered a position in the Tokugawa shogunate's department of ceremonies.

In 1719, Takebe's new map of Japan was completed; and the work was highly valued for its quality and detail.

Shōgun Yoshimune honored Takebe with rank and successively better positions in the shogunate.

== Legacy ==
Takebe played a critical role in the development of the Enri (円理, "circle principle") - a crude analogon to the western calculus. He also created charts for trigonometric functions.

He achieved a power series expansion of $(\arcsin(x))^2$ in 1722, 15 years earlier than Euler. This was the first power series expansion obtained in Wasan. This result was first conjectured by heavy numeric computation.

He used the Richardson extrapolation in 1695, about 200 years earlier than Richardson.

He also computed 41 digits of $\pi$, based on polygon approximation and the Richardson extrapolation.

=== Takebe Prizes ===
In the context of its 50th anniversary celebrations, the Mathematical Society of Japan established the Takebe Prize and the Takebe Prizes for the encouragement of young people who show promise as mathematicians.

== Selected works ==
In a statistical overview derived from writings by and about Takebe Kenko, OCLC/WorldCat encompasses roughly 10+ works in 10+ publications in 3 languages and 10+ library holdings.

- 1683 – Kenki sanpō (研幾算法) OCLC 22056510086
- 1685 – Hatsubi sanpō endan genkai (發微算法演段諺解) OCLC 22056085721

== See also ==
- Sangaku, the custom of presenting mathematical problems, carved in wood tablets, to the public in shinto shrines
- Soroban, a Japanese abacus
- Japanese mathematics
- Richardson extrapolation
