= Koide Chōjūrō =

Japanese mathematician

Koide Chōjūrō (小出 長十郎; October 16, 1797 – October 6, 1865), also known as Koide Shuke, was a Japanese mathematician in the Edo period.

Koide was a student of Wada Nei. Students of Koide included Fukuda Riken, who is also known as Fukuda Sen.

The first extensive logarithmic table was published in 1844 by Koide Shuki. This was twenty years after the death of Sakabe Kōhan, whose Sampo Tenzan Shinan-roku (Treatise on Tenzan Algebra) in 1810 proposed the use of logarithmic tables. Sakebe explained that "these tables save much labor, [but] they are but little known for the reason that they have never been printed in our country." This can be explained by the conventional thinking of the period. For example, Koide exhibited a fixed point-of-view in his preface to Tan-i sampō in 1840, explaining:

Number dwells in the heavens and in the earth, but the arts are of human make, some being accurate and others not. The minuteness of our mathematical work far surpasses that to be found in the West, because our power is a divine inheritance, fostered by the noble and daring spirit of a nation that is exalted over the other nations of the world.

During the Tenpō era, Koide translated portions of Jérôme Lalande's work on astronomy. He presented this work to the Astronomy Board as evidence of the superiority of the European calendar, but the effort produced no identifiable effect. However, Koide's work and translations of other Western writers did indirectly affect the Tenpo calendar revision in 1842–1844. Koide was part of the team of astronomers and mathematicians working on an improved lunar calendar system. A great many errors had been found in the lunar calendar; and revisions were publicly adopted in 1844. The new calendar was called the Tenpō-Jinin calendar. It was in use in Japan until 1872 when the Gregorian calendar was adopted.

== Selected works ==
Koide's published writings are few.

- 1840 — Tan'i sanpō (Kenmochi Yōshichi Shōkō, ed.).
- 1897 — Sanpō tametebako (Fukuda Sen, ed.).

== See also ==
- Sangaku, the custom of presenting mathematical problems, carved in wood tablets, to the public in shinto shrines
- Soroban, a Japanese abacus
- Japanese mathematics
