= Wada Nei =

Japanese mathematician

Wada Yenzō Nei (和田 寧; 1787 – October 13, 1840), also known as Wada Yasushi, was a Japanese mathematician in the Edo period. His birth name was Kōyama Naoaki; but he changed his name to Wada Nei, by which he became more widely known.

== Life and work ==
Wada studied under the patronage of the hereditary Chief court calendar-maker (暦博士, Reki-hakase) in the court of the emperor.

Wada became a student of Kusaka Sei, who had been a student of Ajima Chokuyen. Wada extended Ajima Chokuyen's development of an integral calculus within the Enri (円理, "circle principle") context. He worked on the computation of minimum and maximum values (roughly by equating the first derivative to 0) and gave reasoning and insight to the computation method that was given without explanation by Seki Takakazu about 100 years earlier. He was also the first Japanese mathematician to study roulettes.

== Selected works ==
Wada's published writings are few.

- Enri kigen (員理起元) OCLC 22035715224

== See also ==
- Sangaku, the custom of presenting mathematical problems, carved in wood tablets, to the public in shinto shrines
- Soroban, a Japanese abacus
- Japanese mathematics
