= Fujita Sadasuke =

Japanese mathematician

Fujita Sadasuke (藤田 定資; December 12, 1734 - September 9, 1807), also known as Honda Teiken, was a Japanese mathematician in the Edo period. He is the author of Seiyō sampō (Essence of Mathematics) which was published in 1781.

Sadasuke was the father of Fujita Kagen (1765–1821), who is credited with publishing the first collection of sangaku problems.

== Selected works ==
In a statistical overview derived from writings by and about Fujita Sadasuke, OCLC/WorldCat encompasses roughly 30 works in 30+ publications in 1 language and 30+ library holdings

- New Difference (招差新術, Shōsa shinjutsu), 1769
- The Essence of Mathematics (精要算法, Seiyō sanpō), 1781
- Mathematical Problems Suspended Before the temple (神壁算法, Shinpeki sanpō), 1796
- Further Sacred Mathematical Problems (續神壁算法, Zoku Shinpeki sanpō), 1807

== See also ==
- Sangaku, the custom of presenting mathematical problems, carved in wood tablets, to the public in Shinto shrines
- Soroban, a Japanese abacus
- Japanese mathematics
