= Japanese theorem =

The term Japanese theorem refers to either of the following two geometrical theorems:

- Japanese theorem for cyclic polygons
- Japanese theorem for cyclic quadrilaterals
