= Yasuaki =

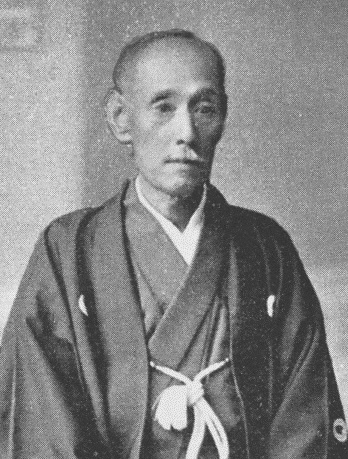
- Yasuaki Kato (1846–1926), Japanese daimyō
- Pronunciation: jasɯakʲi (IPA)
- Gender: Male

Origin
- Origin: Japanese
- Meaning: Different meanings depending on the kanji used

Yasuaki is a masculine Japanese given name.

== Written forms ==
Yasuaki can be written using many different combinations of kanji characters. Here are some examples:

- 康明, "healthy, bright"
- 康朗, "healthy, clear"
- 康昭, "healthy, clear"
- 康秋, "healthy, autumn"
- 康晶, "healthy, sparkle"
- 靖明, "peaceful, bright"
- 靖朗, "peaceful, clear"
- 靖昭, "peaceful, clear
- 靖秋, "peaceful, autumn"
- 靖晶, "peaceful, sparkle"
- 安明, "tranquil, bright"
- 安昭, "tranquil, clear"
- 安秋, "tranquil, autumn"
- 保明, "preserve, bright"
- 保昭, "preserve, clear"
- 保秋, "preserve, autumn"
- 泰明, "peaceful, bright"
- 泰昭, "peaceful, clear"
- 泰晃, "peaceful, clear"
- 易明, "divination, bright"
- 易晶, "divination, history"
- 恭明, "respectful, bright"

The name can also be written in hiragana やすあき or katakana ヤスアキ.

== Notable people with the name ==
- Yasuaki Aida (会田 安明; 1747–1817), Japanese mathematician
- Yasuaki Kato (加藤 泰明; born 1976), Japanese footballer
- Yasuaki Kato (加藤 泰秋; 1846–1926), Japanese daimyō
- Yasuaki Kurata (倉田 保昭; born 1946), Japanese actor
- Yasuaki Mitsumori (三森 泰明; born 1946), Japanese volleyball player
- Yasuaki Murayama (村山 慈明; born 1984), Japanese shogi player
- Yasuaki Okamoto (岡本 賢明; born 1988), Japanese footballer
- Yasuaki Oshima (大島 康明; born 1981), Japanese footballer
- Yasuaki Shimizu (清水 靖晃; born 1954), Japanese composer and saxophonist
- Yasuaki Takumi (内匠 靖明; born 1982), Japanese voice actor
- Yasuaki Tsukada (塚田 泰明; born 1964), Japanese shogi player
- Yasuaki Yamasaki (山崎 康晃, born 1992), Japanese professional baseball player
