= Kurushima Kinai =

Japanese mathematician

Kurushima Kinai (久留島 喜内, died January 9, 1757), also known as Kurushima Yoshita and Kurushima Yoshihiro (久留島 義太), was a Japanese mathematician in the Edo period.

The Japanese board game of shogi attracted Kurushima's interest; and he was recognized in his own time as a master player. Among shogi players, he continues today to be well known for seven "puzzle ring" gambits with subsequent sequenced maneuvers—including the "silver puzzle ring."

In his lifetime, he was recognized among the most prominent intellectuals. His mathematical gift was highly esteemed. Kurushima, like most of his contemporaries, was very interested in the mathematical problems involved in "magic squares."

== Selected works ==
Kurushima's published writings are few.

- Kurushima kyokusū (久留島極数) OCLC 033747221
- Kyūshi ikō. 1 (久氏遺稿. 天之卷) OCLC 033745707
- Kyūshi ikō. 2 (久氏遺稿. 地之卷) OCLC 033746085
- Heihō reiyaku no jutsu (平方零約之術) OCLC 033745451

== See also ==
- Sangaku, the custom of presenting mathematical problems, carved in wood tablets, to the public in shinto shrines
- Soroban, a Japanese abacus
- Japanese mathematics
