= Kuros =

Kuros may refer to:

- Kuros, Iran or Hoseynabad-e Koru, a village in Semnan Province, Iran
- Kuros (company), an online sportwear retailer
- Kuros, a character in Wizards & Warriors
- Kuros, a PC game by Sandlot Games

== People with the surname ==
- Kevin Kuros (fl. 2010s), American state legislator who served in the Massachusetts House of Representatives

== See also ==
- Kuro (disambiguation)
