= Yoshida Mitsuyoshi =

Japanese mathematician

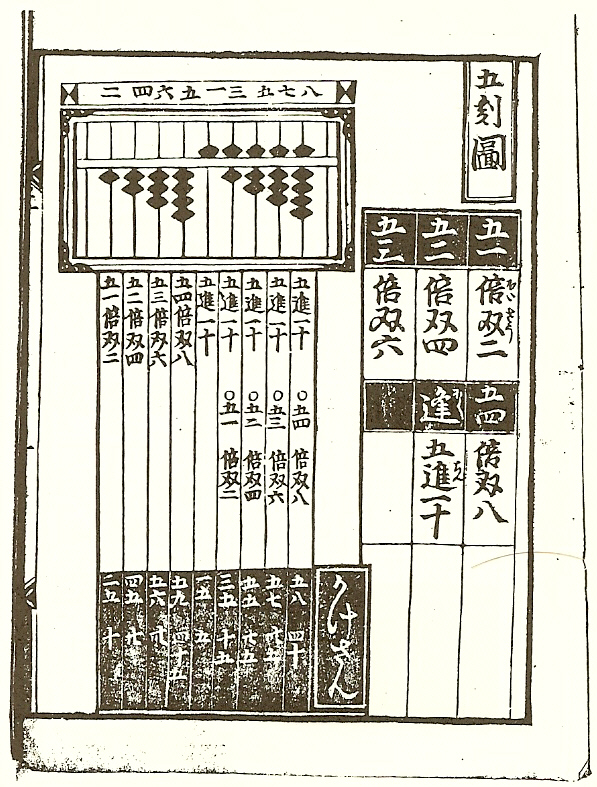
The soroban in Yoshida Kōyū's Jinkōki, 1641 edition

Yoshida Mitsuyoshi (吉田 光由, 1598 – January 8, 1672), also known as Yoshida Kōyū, was a Japanese mathematician in the Edo period. His popular and widely disseminated published work made him the most well known writer about mathematics in his lifetime.

He was a student of Kambei Mori (also known as Mōri Shigeyoshi). Along with Imamura Chishō and Takahara Kisshu, Yoshida became known to his contemporaries as one of "the Three Arithmeticians."

Yoshida was the author of the oldest extant Japanese mathematical text. The 1627 work was named Jinkōki. The work dealt with the subject of soroban arithmetic, including square and cube root operations.

== Selected works ==
In a statistical overview derived from writings by and about Yoshida Mitsuyoshi, OCLC/WorldCat encompasses roughly 20+ works in 30+ publications in 1 language and 40+ library holdings.

- 1643 — Jinkōki (塵劫記), OCLC 22023455088
- 1659 — Shinpen Jinkōki (新編塵劫記), OCLC 22057549632
- 1818 — Sanpō chiedakara (筭法智惠寳), OCLC 22057124215
- 1850 — Chikamichi Jinkōki (近道塵劫記), OCLC 22055982082

== See also ==
- Sangaku, the custom of presenting mathematical problems, carved in wood tablets, to the public in shinto shrines
- Soroban, a Japanese abacus
- Japanese mathematics
