= Japanese mathematics =

Independent development of mathematics in Japan during the isolation of the Edo period

Japanese mathematics (和算, wasan) denotes a distinct kind of mathematics which was developed in Japan during the Edo period (1603–1867). The term wasan, from wa ("Japanese") and san ("calculation"), was coined in the 1870s and employed to distinguish native Japanese mathematical theory from Western mathematics (洋算 yōsan).

In the history of mathematics, the development of wasan falls outside the Western realm. At the beginning of the Meiji period (1868–1912), Japan and its people opened themselves to the West. Japanese scholars adopted Western mathematical technique, and this led to a decline of interest in the ideas used in wasan.

== History ==
=== Pre-Edo period (552-1600) ===
Records of mathematics in the early periods of Japanese history are nearly non-existent. Though it was at this time that a large influx of knowledge from China reached Japan, including that of reading and writing, few sources exist of usage of mathematics within Japan. However, it is suggested that this period saw the use of an exponential numbering system following the law of $a^{m}*a^{n} = a^{m + n}$.

=== Edo period ===
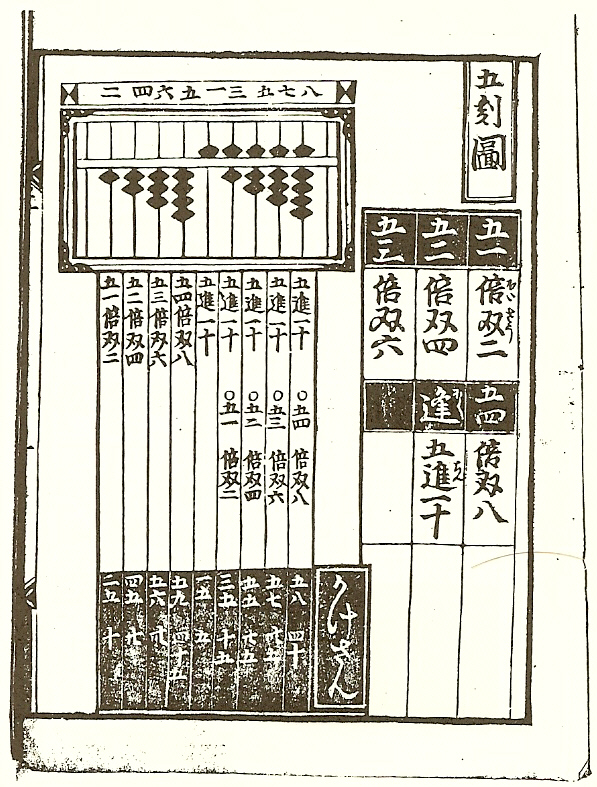
The soroban in Yoshida Koyu's Jinkōki (1641 edition)

The Japanese mathematical schema evolved during a period when Japan's people were isolated from European influences, but instead borrowed from ancient mathematical texts written in China, including those from the Yuan dynasty and earlier. The Japanese mathematicians Yoshida Shichibei Kōyū, Imamura Chishō, and Takahara Kisshu are among the earliest known Japanese mathematicians. They came to be known to their contemporaries as "the Three Arithmeticians".

Yoshida was the author of the oldest extant Japanese mathematical text, the 1627 work called Jinkōki. The work dealt with the subject of soroban arithmetic, including square and cube root operations. Yoshida's book significantly inspired a new generation of mathematicians, and redefined the Japanese perception of educational enlightenment, which was defined in the Seventeen Article Constitution as "the product of earnest meditation".

Seki Takakazu developed enri (円理, “circle principles”), a mathematical system that addressed problems involving areas, volumes, and infinite series, broadly comparable in some aims to the problems later addressed by calculus in Europe. However Seki's investigations did not proceed from the same foundations as those used by Newton and Leibniz in Europe.

Mathematicians like Takebe Katahiro played an important role in developing enri. He obtained a power series expansion of $(\arcsin(x))^2$ in 1722, 15 years earlier than Euler. He used Richardson extrapolation in 1695, about 200 years earlier than Richardson. He also computed 41 digits of π, based on polygon approximation and Richardson extrapolation.

== Select mathematicians ==
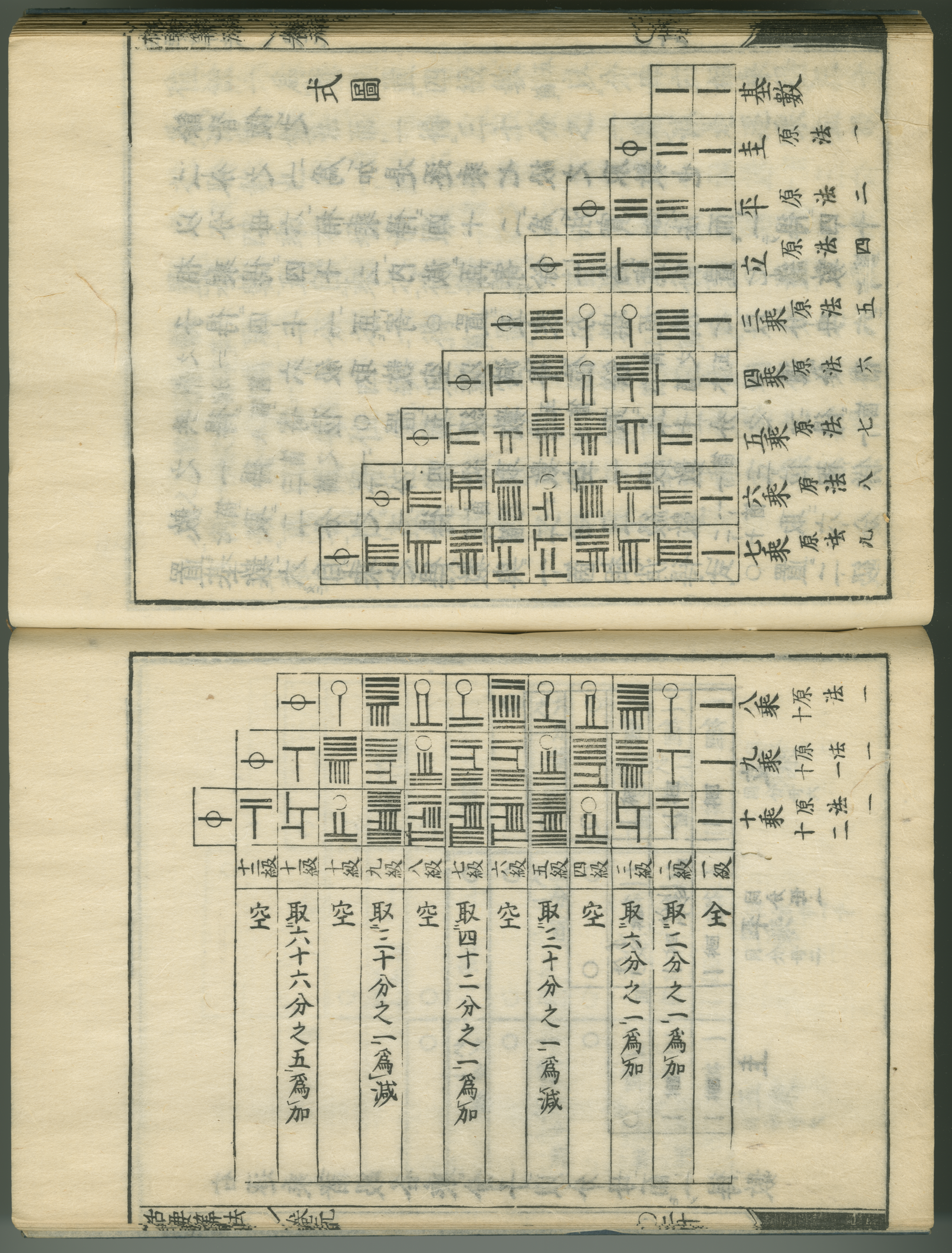
Replica of Katsuyo Sampo by Seki Takakazu. Page written about Bernoulli number and Binomial coefficient.

The following list encompasses mathematicians whose work was derived from wasan.

- Yoshida Mitsuyoshi (1598–1672)
- Seki Takakazu (1642–1708)
- Takebe Kenkō (1664–1739)
- Matsunaga Ryohitsu (fl. 1718-1749)
- Kurushima Kinai (d. 1757)
- Arima Raido (1714–1783)
- Fujita Sadasuke (1734-1807)
- Ajima Naonobu (1739–1783)
- Aida Yasuaki (1747–1817)
- Sakabe Kōhan (1759–1824)
- Fujita Kagen (1765–1821)
- Hasegawa Ken (c. 1783-1838)
- Wada Nei (1787–1840)
- Shiraishi Chochu (1796–1862)
- Koide Shuke (1797–1865)
- Omura Isshu (1824–1871)

== See also ==
- Japanese theorem for cyclic polygons
- Japanese theorem for cyclic quadrilaterals
- Hungarian mathematics
- Sangaku, the custom of presenting mathematical problems, carved in wood tablets, to the public in Shinto shrines
- Soroban, a Japanese abacus
- Category:Japanese mathematicians
