= Kurushima (disambiguation) =

Kurushima is a Japanese island in the Inland Sea forming part of the city of Imabari, Ehime Prefecture

Kurushima may also refer to:

== People ==
- Hidesaburō Kurushima (1888–1970), a Japanese industrialist, writer and scouting leader
- Kurushima Kinai (died 1757), a Japanese mathematician in the Edo period; also known as Kurushima Yoshita and Kurushima Yoshihiro
- Kurushima Michifusa (1562–1597), a Japanese samurai of the late Sengoku period
- Kurushima Takehiko (1874–1960), an author known as "the Japanese Hans Christian Andersen"

== Other uses ==
- Kurushima I, a Japanese ferry, built in 1969 and later Senopati Nusantara
- Kurushima Kaikyō Bridge connects the island of Ōshima to the main part of Shikoku in Japan
- 140038 Kurushima, a minor planet
