= Aida Yasuaki =

Japanese mathematician

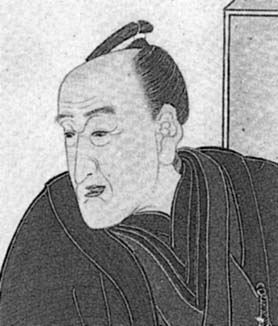
- Born: 10 February 1747
- Died: 26 October 1817 (aged 70)
- Scientific career
- Fields: Mathematics

Aida Yasuaki (会田 安明; February 10, 1747 – October 26, 1817) also known as Aida Ammei, was a Japanese mathematician in the Edo period.

He made significant contributions to the fields of number theory and geometry, and furthered methods for simplifying continued fractions.

Aida created an original symbol for "equal". This was the first appearance of the notation for equal in East Asia.

== Selected works ==
In a statistical overview derived from writings by and about Aida Yasuaki, OCLC/WorldCat encompasses roughly 50 works in 50+ publications in 1 language and 50+ library holdings.

- 1784 — Shoyaku konʼitsujutsu (諸約混一術) OCLC 22057343766
- 1785 — Kaisei sanpō (改精算法) OCLC 22049703851, Counter-arguments with seiyo sampō
- 1787 — Kaisei sanpō kaiseiron (改精算法改正論) OCLC 22056510030, Counter-arguments with seiyo sampō, new edition
- 1788 — Kaiwaku sanpō (解惑筭法) OCLC 22056510044
- 1797 — Sanpō kakujo (筭法廓如) OCLC 22057185824
- 1801 — Sanpō hi hatsuran (筭法非撥亂) OCLC 22057185770
- 1811 — Sanpō tensei-ho shinan (算法天生法指南, Mathematical Introduction of 'Tensei-ho)

== See also ==
- Sangaku, the custom of presenting mathematical problems, carved in wood tablets, to the public in shinto shrines
- Soroban, a Japanese abacus
- Japanese mathematics
