= Jinkōki =

Japanese mathematics text

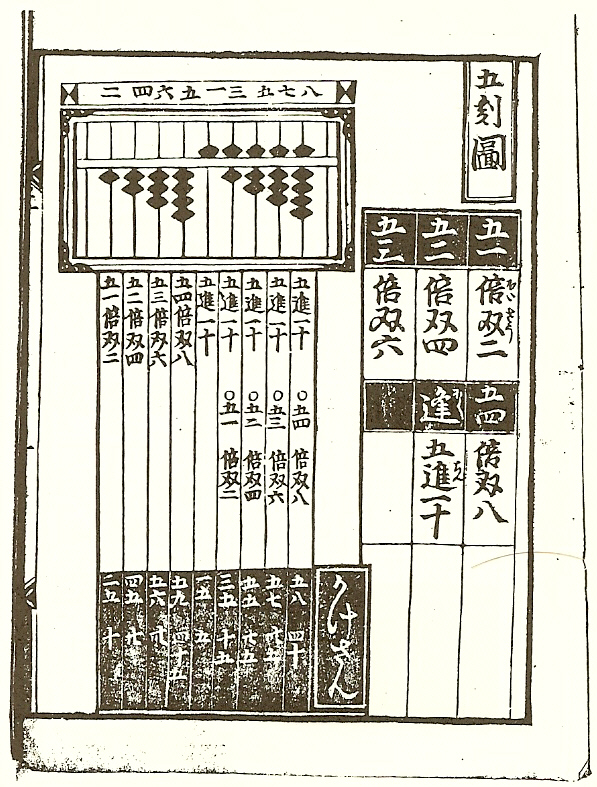
- Section from the Jinkōki
- Editor: Yoshida Mitsuyoshi
- Original title: 塵劫記
- Language: Japanese
- Publication date: 1627
- Publication place: Japan

Jinkōki (塵劫記) is a three-volume work on Japanese mathematics, first edited and published by Yoshida Mitsuyoshi in 1627. Over his lifetime, Mitsuyoshi revised Jinkōki several times. The edition released in the eleventh year of the Kan'ei era (1641) became particularly widespread. The last version personally published by Mitsuyoshi was the Idai (井大), which came out in the eighteenth year of the Kan'ei (1634). Subsequent to that, various editions of Jinkōki were released, one of which includes Shinpen Jinkōki (新編塵劫記).

Jinkōki is one of the most popular and influential Japanese mathematics books in history, having influenced Seki Takakazu, Kaibara Ekken, and many other later Japanese mathematicians. It is partly based on the works of Yuan dynasty mathematicians in China.

== Etymology ==
The name Jinkōki is derived from jintenkō (塵点劫), an immeasurably long span of time mentioned in the Lotus Sutra, hence the nuance of permanence in the Sino-Japanese word jinkō and its reflection in English title.

== Content ==
The book contained instructions for dividing and multiplying with a soroban and mathematical problems relevant to merchants and craftsmen. The book also contained several interesting mathematical problems, and was the first Japanese book to use printing in colour. As a result, the Jinkōki became the most popular Japanese mathematics book ever and one of the most widely read books of the Edo period. Mitsuyoshi made reference to everyday problems, such as buying and selling rice.

The book was originally published in three volumes, the first of which mainly describes multiplication and division using the soroban. The second and third volumes include an assortment of practical and recreational problems. The included problems are not arranged according to any specific order.

The book includes ideas that aimed to keep readers from boredom by adopting a wide variety of problems such as calculations of areas of rice fields, problems related to the construction of rivers and riverbanks, geometric progression, and the Josephus problem. The Shinpen Jinkōki was the most widespread version among the copies of Jinkōki, and widely used as a textbook for use of the soroban throughout the Edo period.

In addition to fundamental knowledge such as numerical notation, units, and multiplication tables, it also included slightly more specialised topics, such as methods to find square roots and cube roots, practical calculations of area, currency conversion, and interest calculation. The content covers almost all arithmetic needed in daily life at that time, and it is a characteristic of the book that explanations are given using familiar topics, such as using the increase of mice as an example for geometric progression.

Many different versions were published, with slightly modified content, and by the time of the Meiji era, over 400 editions of Jinkōki had been published.

== Gallery ==
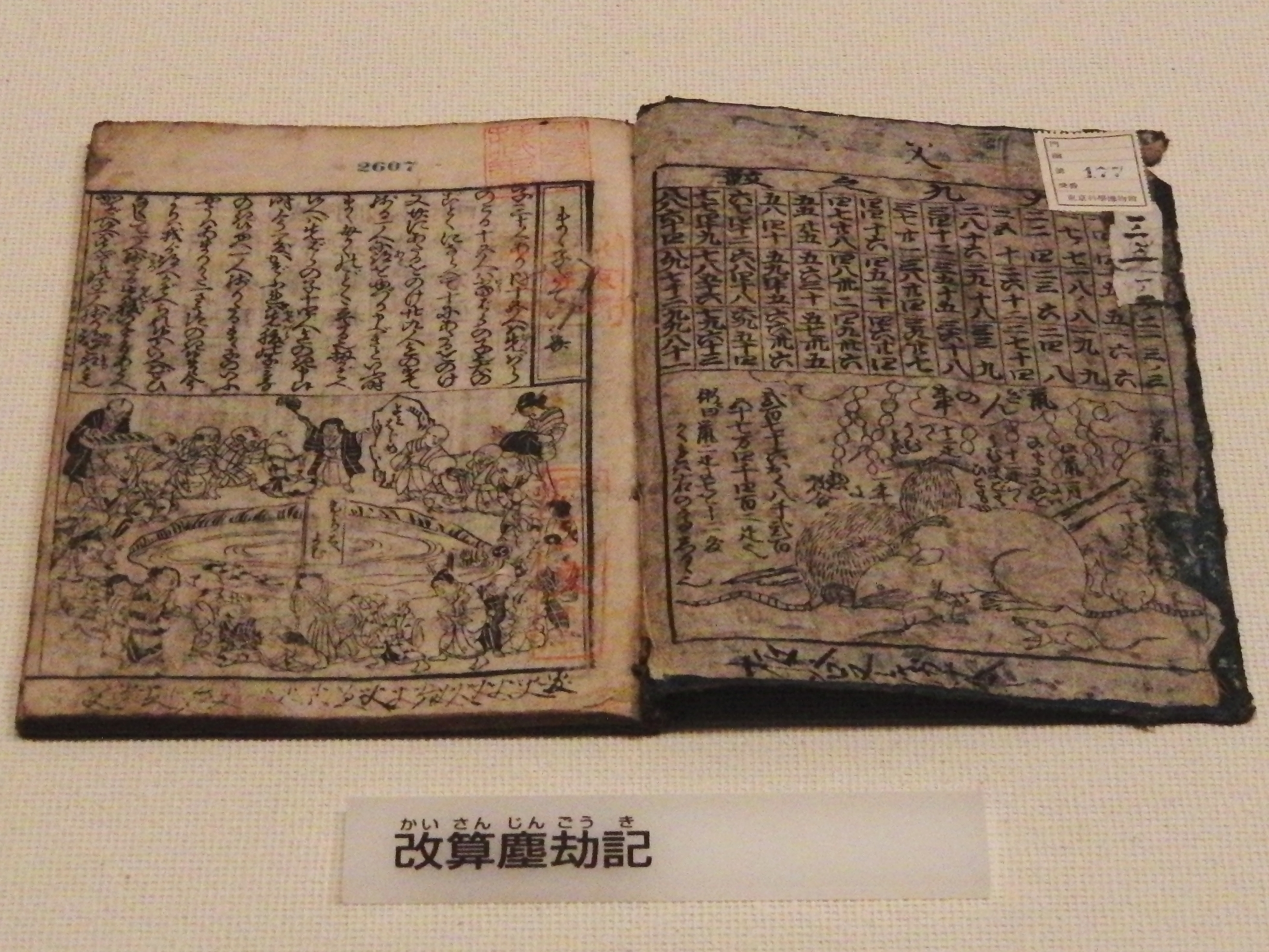
Copy of Jinkōki found in National Museum of Nature and Science

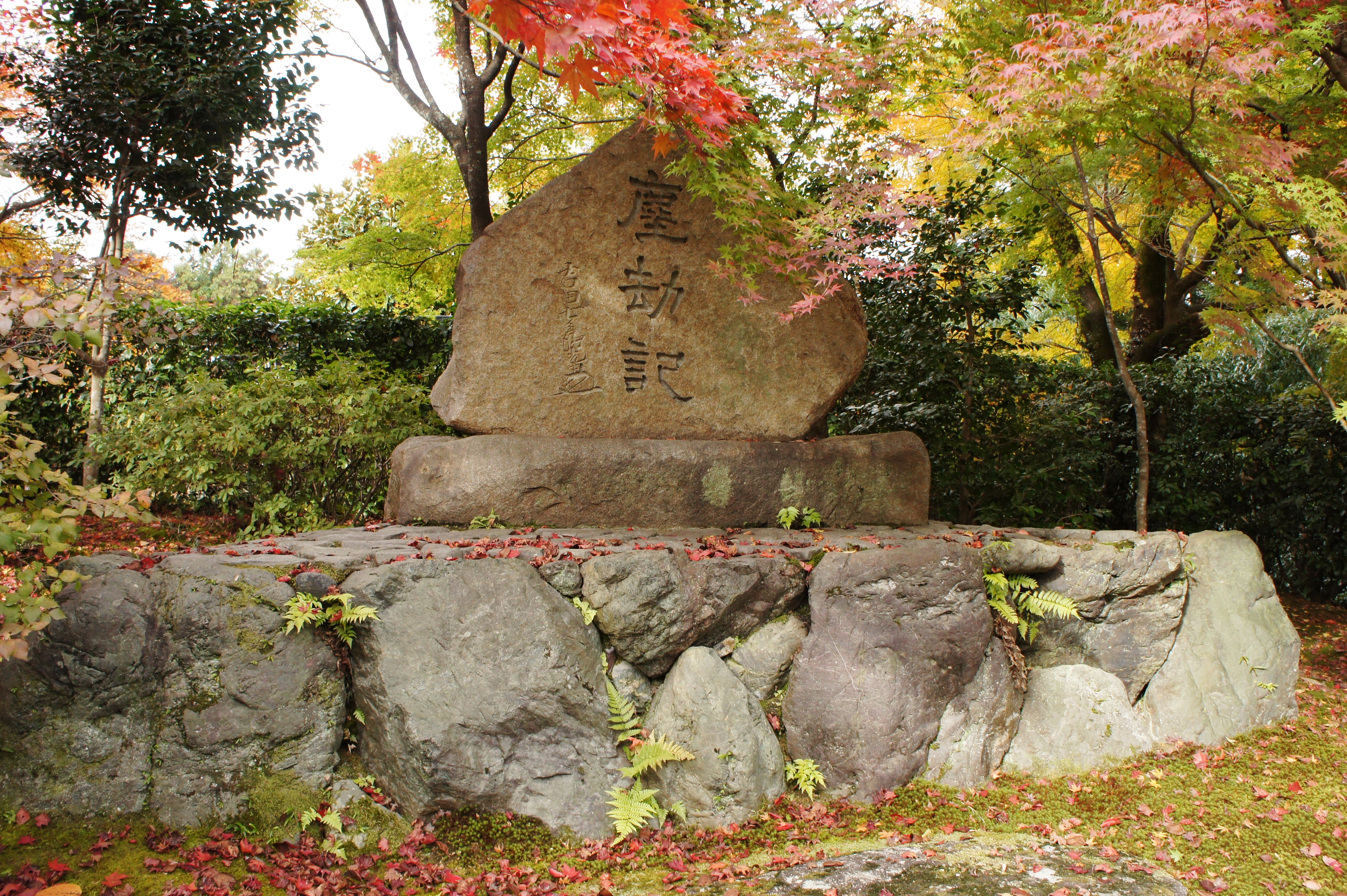
Monument inscribed with the words Jinkōki

== See also ==
- Japanese mathematics
