= Eyeball theorem =

Statement in elementary geometry

Eyeball theorem: red chords are of equal length. Variant: blue chords are of equal length.

The eyeball theorem is a statement in elementary geometry about a property of a pair of disjoint circles.

More precisely it states the following:

For two nonintersecting circles $c_P$ and $c_Q$ centered at $P$ and $Q$, label the points where the tangent lines from P onto $c_Q$ cross $c_P$ as $A$ and $B$, and label the points where the tangents from Q onto $c_P$ cross $c_Q$ as $C$ and $D$. Then $|AB| = |CD|$.

The eyeball theorem was discovered in the 1960s by the Peruvian mathematician Antonio Gutierrez. However, without the use of its current name it was already posed and solved as a problem in an article by George W. Evans in 1938. Evans stated that the problem was given in "some examination paper".

A related theorem states that if $F$ and $J$ are points of tangency from $Q$ on $c_P$ and from $P$ on $c_Q$ respectively, and one draws line $FJ$ in such a way that it intersects $c_P$ for the second time at $F'$ and $c_Q$ at $J'$, then $|FF'|=|JJ'|$.

Several proofs are known; one derives the theorem from the Japanese theorem for cyclic quadrilaterals.

== See also ==
- Japanese theorem for cyclic quadrilaterals
