= Kuroshima =

Kuroshima or Kuro Island may refer to various Japanese islands:

- Kuroshima, Ehime (uninhabited)
- Kuroshima, Kagoshima, part of Mishima village
- Kuroshima, Tokashiki, Okinawa, in Tokashiki
- Kuroshima, Taketomi, Okinawa, one of the Yaeyama Islands, in the town of Taketomi

== People with the surname ==
- Denji Kuroshima (1898–1943), Japanese author
- Kameto Kuroshima (1893–1965), Imperial Japanese Navy Admiral
- Yuina Kuroshima (born 1997), Japanese model and actress

== See also ==
- Kurushima (disambiguation)
