= Japanese theorem for cyclic quadrilaterals =

Centers of the incircles of triangles inside a cyclic quadrilateral form a rectangle

Japanese theorem: □M_{1}M_{2}M_{3}M_{4} is a rectangle. $r_1+r_3=r_2+r_4$

In geometry, the Japanese theorem states that the centers of the incircles of certain triangles inside a cyclic quadrilateral are vertices of a rectangle. It was originally stated on a sangaku tablet on a temple in Yamagata prefecture, Japan, in 1880.

Triangulating an arbitrary cyclic quadrilateral by its diagonals yields four overlapping triangles (each diagonal creates two triangles). The centers of the incircles of those triangles form a rectangle.

Specifically, let □ABCD be an arbitrary cyclic quadrilateral and let M_{1}, M_{2}, M_{3}, M_{4} be the incenters of the triangles △ABD, △ABC, △BCD, △ACD. Then the quadrilateral formed by M_{1}, M_{2}, M_{3}, M_{4} is a rectangle. Proofs are given by Bogomolny and Reyes.

This theorem may be extended to prove the Japanese theorem for cyclic polygons, according to which the sum of inradii of a triangulated cyclic polygon does not depend on how it is triangulated. The special case of the theorem for quadrilaterals states that the two pairs of opposite incircles of the theorem above have equal sums of radii. To prove the quadrilateral case, simply construct the parallelogram tangent to the corners of the constructed rectangle, with sides parallel to the diagonals of the quadrilateral. The construction shows that the parallelogram is a rhombus, which is equivalent to showing that the sums of the radii of the incircles tangent to each diagonal are equal. This related result comes from an earlier sangaku tablet, also from Yamagata, from 1800.

The quadrilateral case immediately proves the general case, as any two triangulations of an arbitrary cyclic polygon can be connected by a sequence of flips that change one diagonal to another, replacing two incircles in a quadrilateral by the other two incircles with equal sum of radii.

== See also ==
- Carnot's theorem
- Eyeball theorem
- Japanese mathematics
