= Carnot's theorem (inradius, circumradius) =

Theorem in Euclidean geometry

$|DG| + |DH| - |DF| = R + r$

In Euclidean geometry, Carnot's theorem (English: /kɑːrˈnoʊ/ kar-NOH, French: [kaʁno]) states that the sum of the signed distances from the circumcenter $D$ to the sides of an arbitrary triangle $ABC$ is
$$DF + DG + DH = R + r,\$$

where $r$ is the inradius and $R$ is the circumradius of the triangle. Here the sign of the distances is taken to be negative if and only if the open line segment $DX$ (for $X$ equal to $F$, $G$, or $H$) lies completely outside the triangle. For example, in the diagram, $DF$ is negative and both $DG$ and $DH$ are positive. The theorem can be viewed as saying that the sum of the actual-distance trilinear coordinates of the circumcenter is $R+r$.

The theorem is named after Lazare Carnot (1753–1823). It is used in a proof of the Japanese theorem for concyclic polygons.
