= Mount Kuro =

Mount Kuro or Kurotake (literally Black Mountain) may refer to:

- Mount Kuro (Hokkaido)
- Mount Suisho, also known as Mount Kuro
