= Kurõ =

Village in Estonia

- Village
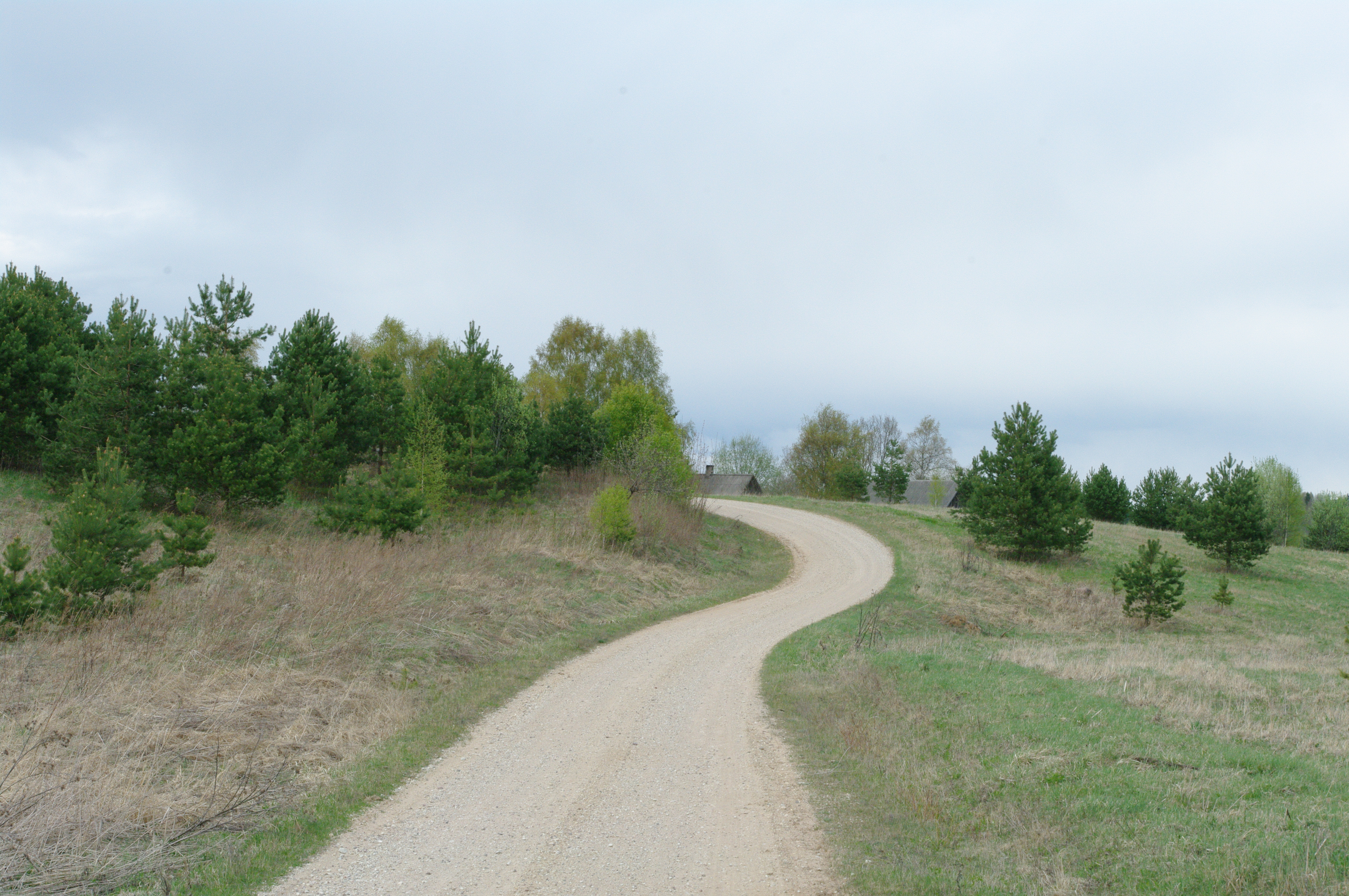
- Road to Kurõ village

- Location within Estonia
- Coordinates: 57.563333333333°N 27.233333333333°E
- Country: Estonia
- County: Võru County
- Parish: Rõuge Parish
- Time zone: UTC+2 (EET)
  - Summer (DST): UTC+3 (EEST)

Kurõ is a village in Rõuge Parish, Võru County in Estonia.
