= Kuros (company) =

American sportswear company

- Company type: Private
- Industry: Retail
- Founded: March 2013
- Founder: Kuro Tawil
- Headquarters: Austin, Texas, U.S.
- Area served: Worldwide
- Key people: Kuro Tawil, CEO
- Products: Women's sportswear
- Owner: Kuro Tawil
- Website: www.kuros.com

Kuros is an American online retailer, based in Austin, Texas, that sells sportswear to women and men worldwide. The company was founded in 2013 by Kuro Tawil an entrepreneur from Austin who believes every woman has the right to defend themselves from crimes like assault and rape. The company sells products made in Nepal, with every Kuros product sold the company donates a can of pepper spray to at risk populations of women.

== History ==
Kuro Tawil was on a solo-backpacking trip through South Western Asia in 2013, shortly after graduating from Texas State University. While traveling, he realized how large the issue of sexual violence is around the world and saw how in many developing countries the law and justice system were ineffective. Tawil realized many of these women needed a way to take their protection and their lives into their own hands, seeing the need for a realistic way for a woman to be able to defend themselves. Tawil returned home to Texas and started the conscious business Kuros, as a way to fund the distribution of pepper spray to at risk populations of women.

== Pepper Spray Distribution ==
Kuros uses "buy one, give one" model, where for each product purchased, the company pays for a can of pepper spray to be distributed to a woman in developing countries. Kuros collaborates with non-governmental organizations around the world to facilitate the distribution of their pepper spray donations. They have distributed pepper spray in four continents, with networks in India, South Africa, El Salvador and the Philippines.

== Partnerships ==
In 2015, Kuros partnered with Security Equipment Corporation, a Fenton, Missouri–based manufacturer of pepper spray known for producing SABRE Red. Kuros utilizes and distributes SABRE Red in countries where available. Security Equipment Corporation released a Kuros branded pepper spray in the United States. The Kuros branded SABRE Red pepper spray won Honorable Mention at the 2016 NRHA Trade show.

In 2019, Kuros ended the partnership with Security Equipment Corporation, and created a new partnership with Mace Security International, a Cleveland, Ohio–based manufacturer of pepper spray.
