= Ajima Naonobu =

Japanese mathematician (1732–1798)

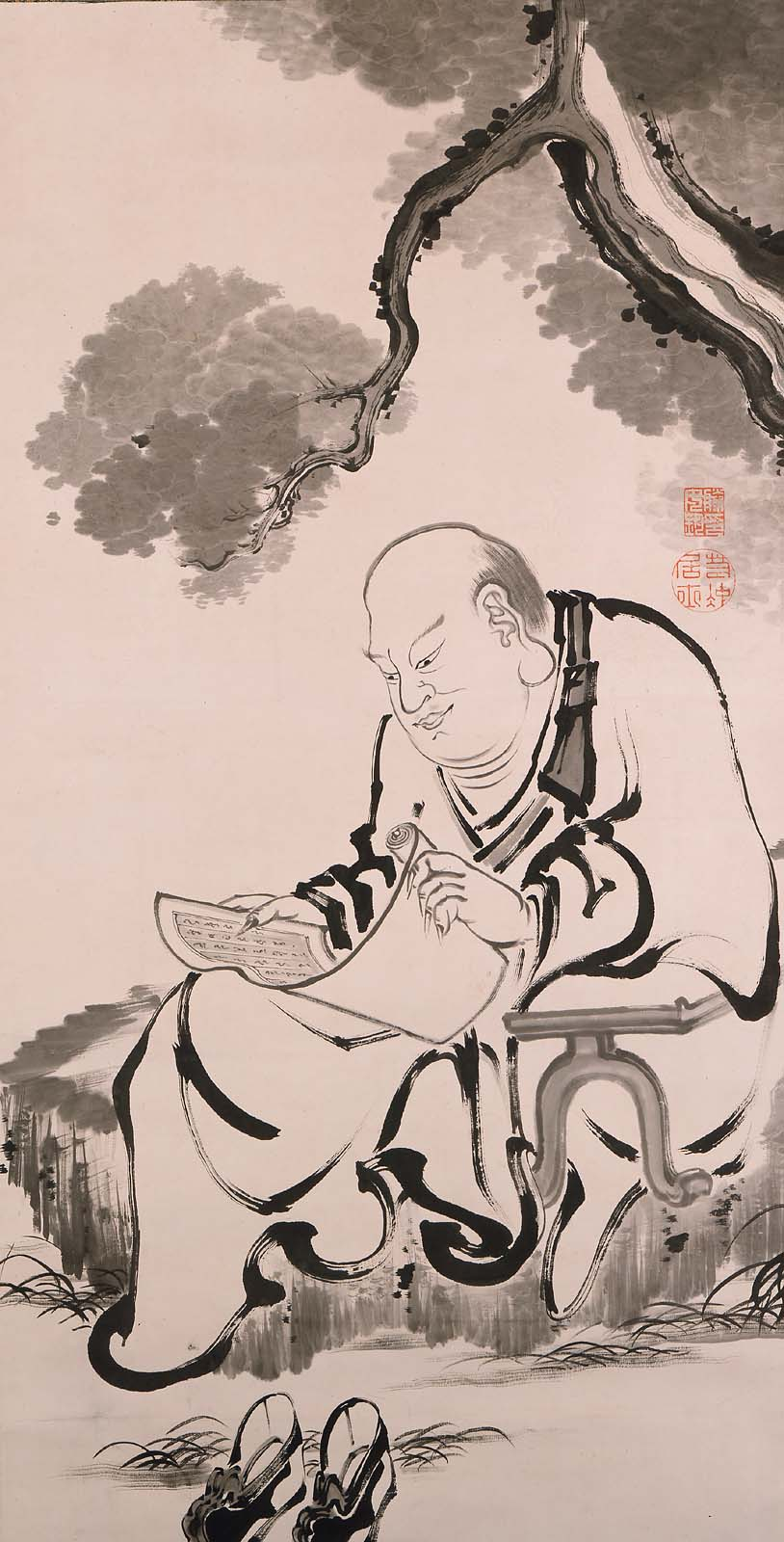
- Born: 1732
- Died: May 20, 1798 (aged 65–66)
- Occupation: Mathematician
- Known for: Credited with introducing calculus into Japanese mathematics

Ajima Naonobu (安島 直円; 1732 – May 20, 1798), also known as Ajima Manzō Chokuyen, was a Japanese mathematician of the Edo period.

His Dharma name was (祖眞院智算量空居士).

== Work ==
Ajima is credited with introducing calculus into Japanese mathematics. The significance of this innovation is diminished by a likelihood that he had access to European writings on the subject. Ajima also posed the question of inscribing three mutually tangent circles in a triangle; these circles are now known as Malfatti circles after the later work of Gian Francesco Malfatti, but two triangle centers derived from them, the Ajima–Malfatti points, are named after Ajima.

Ajima was an astronomer at the Shogun's Observatory (Bakufu Temmongaki).

== Legacy ==
In 1976, the International Astronomical Union (IAU) honored Ajima by identifying a crater on the Moon with his name. Naonobu is a small lunar impact crater located on the eastern Mare Fecunditatis, to the northwest of the prominent crater Langrenus.

== Selected works ==
In a statistical overview derived from writings by and about Ajima Naonobu, OCLC/WorldCat encompasses roughly 20+ works in 30+ publications in two languages and 40+ library holdings.

- Ajima Naonobu zenshū (安島直円全集) OCLC 017232052, collected works
- Sanpō kosō (算法考艸) OCLC 057185881, algorithms considered
- Jujireki bimmo (Introduction of the 'Works and Days Calendar')
- Anshi seiyo-reki koso (Ajima's Studies for Western Calendars)
- Ajima sensei bimmo do jutsu (Methods of Professor Ajima's 'bimmo')
- Koshoku mokyu zokkai (Introduction of Eclipses of the Sun and the Moon)
- Sansha San'en Jutsu (Methods of Three Diagonals and Three Circles)
- Fujin Isshũ (Periods of Decimal Fractions)

== See also ==
- Sangaku, the custom of presenting mathematical problems, carved in wood tablets, to the public in shinto shrines
- Soroban, a Japanese abacus
- Japanese mathematics
