= Japanese theorem for cyclic polygons =

Theorem in Euclidean geometry

The sum of the radii of the green circles is equal to the sum of the radii of the red circles

In geometry, the Japanese theorem states that no matter how one triangulates a cyclic polygon, the sum of inradii of triangles is constant.

Conversely, if the sum of inradii is independent of the triangulation, then the polygon is cyclic. The Japanese theorem follows from Carnot's theorem; it is a Sangaku problem.

== Proof ==
This theorem can be proven by first proving a special case: no matter how one triangulates a cyclic quadrilateral, the sum of inradii of triangles is constant.

After proving the quadrilateral case, the general case of the cyclic polygon theorem is an immediate corollary. The quadrilateral rule can be applied to quadrilateral components of a general partition of a cyclic polygon, and repeated application of the rule, which "flips" one diagonal, will generate all the possible partitions from any given partition, with each "flip" preserving the sum of the inradii.

The quadrilateral case follows from a simple extension of the Japanese theorem for cyclic quadrilaterals, which shows that a rectangle is formed by the two pairs of incenters corresponding to the two possible triangulations of the quadrilateral. The steps of this theorem require nothing beyond basic constructive Euclidean geometry.

With the additional construction of a parallelogram having sides parallel to the diagonals, and tangent to the corners of the rectangle of incenters, the quadrilateral case of the cyclic polygon theorem can be proved in a few steps. The equality of the sums of the radii of the two pairs is equivalent to the condition that the constructed parallelogram be a rhombus, and this is easily shown in the construction.

Another proof of the quadrilateral case is available due to Wilfred Reyes (2002). In the proof, both the Japanese theorem for cyclic quadrilaterals and the quadrilateral case of the cyclic polygon theorem are proven as a consequence of Thébault's problem III.

== See also ==
- Carnot's theorem, which is used in a proof of the theorem above
- Equal incircles theorem
- Tangent lines to circles
