= Seki Takakazu =

Japanese mathematician (c. 1642–1708)

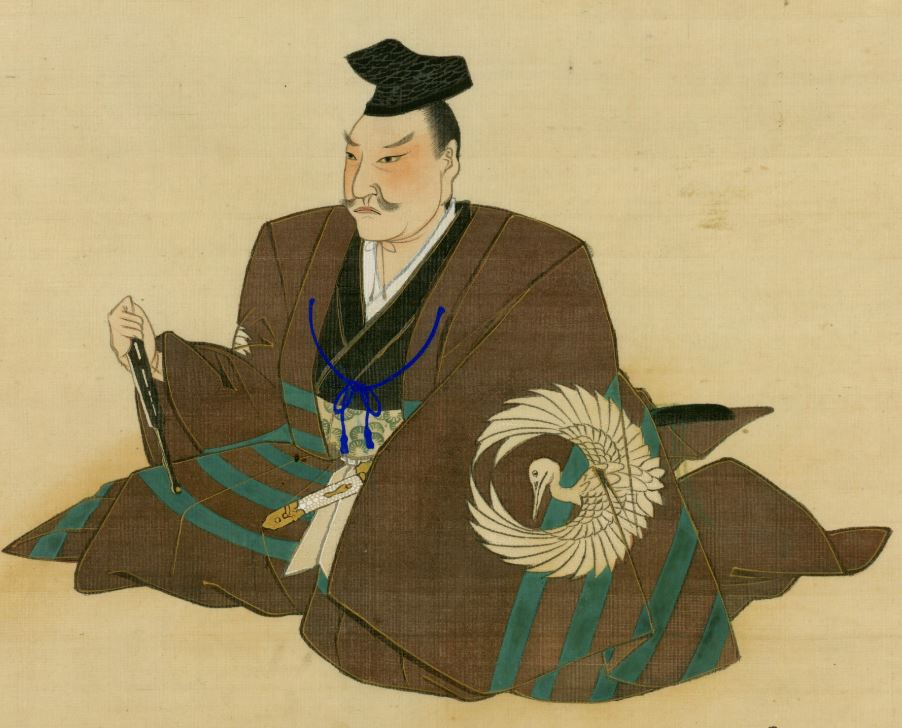
- Ink painting of Seki Takakazu, from the Japan Academy archives in Tokyo.
- Born: 1642(?); Edo or Fujioka, Japan
- Died: December 5, 1708 (Gregorian calendar); Japan
- Other name: Seki Kōwa
- Scientific career
- Fields: Mathematics

Seki Takakazu (関 孝和; c. March 1642 – December 5, 1708), also known as Seki Kōwa (関 孝和), was a mathematician, samurai, and Kofu feudal officer of the early Edo period of Japan.

Seki laid foundations for the subsequent development of Japanese mathematics, known as wasan from c. 1870. He has been described as "Japan's Newton".

He created a new algebraic notation system and, motivated by astronomical computations, did work on Infinitesimal, Infinite series and Diophantine equations. His successors later developed a school dominant in Japanese mathematics until the end of the Edo period.

While it is not clear how much of the achievements of wasan are Seki's, since many of them appear only in writings of his pupils, some of the results parallel or anticipate those discovered in Europe. For example, he is credited with the discovery of Bernoulli numbers. The resultant and determinant (the first in 1683, the complete version no later than 1710) are attributed to him.

Seki also calculated the value of pi correct to the 10th decimal place, having used what is now called the Aitken's delta-squared process, rediscovered later by Alexander Aitken.

Seki was influenced by Japanese mathematics books such as the Jinkōki.

== Biography ==
Not much is known about Seki's personal life. His birthplace has been indicated as either Fujioka in Gunma Prefecture, or Edo. His birth date ranges from 1635 to 1643.

Takakazu Seki was the second son of Uchiyama Shichibei Eimei, a samurai who served Tokugawa Tadanaga (徳川忠長), his mother the daughter of Yuasa Yoemon, a servant of Ando Tsushima Mamoru. Eimei in the 16th year of Kanei (寛永), 1639, was Tenshuban of Edo jō (江戸城) and vassal of Tokugawa Ieyasu (徳川家康).

Seki was born to the Uchiyama clan, a subject of Ko-shu han, and adopted into the Seki family, a subject of the shōgun.

In the first year of Hoei (宝永), 1704, Takakazu was hatamoto (旗本).

While in Ko-shu han, he was involved in a surveying project to produce a reliable map of his employer's land. He spent many years in studying 13th-century Chinese calendars to replace the less accurate one used in Japan at that time.

== Career ==
=== Chinese mathematical roots ===
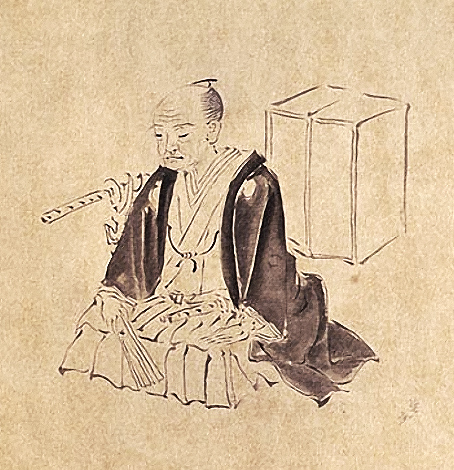
Ink drawing of Seki Takakazu, from the archives of the Ishikawa clan

His mathematics (and wasan as a whole) was based on mathematical knowledge accumulated from the 13th to 15th centuries. The material in these works consisted of algebra with numerical methods, polynomial interpolation and its applications, and indeterminate integer equations. Seki's work is more or less based on and related to these known methods.

Chinese algebraists discovered numerical evaluation (Horner's method, re-established by William George Horner in the 19th century) of arbitrary-degree algebraic equation with real coefficients. By using the Pythagorean theorem, they reduced geometric problems to algebra systematically. The number of unknowns in an equation was, however, quite limited. They used notations of an array of numbers to represent a formula; for example, $(a\ b\ c)$ for $ax^2 + bx + c$.

Later, they developed a method that uses two-dimensional arrays, representing four variables at most, but the scope of this method was limited. Accordingly, a target of Seki and his contemporary Japanese mathematicians was the development of general multivariable algebraic equations and elimination theory.

In the Chinese approach to polynomial interpolation, the motivation was to predict the motion of celestial bodies from observed data. The method was also applied to find various mathematical formulas. Seki learned this technique, most likely, through his close examination of Chinese calendars.

=== Competing with contemporaries ===
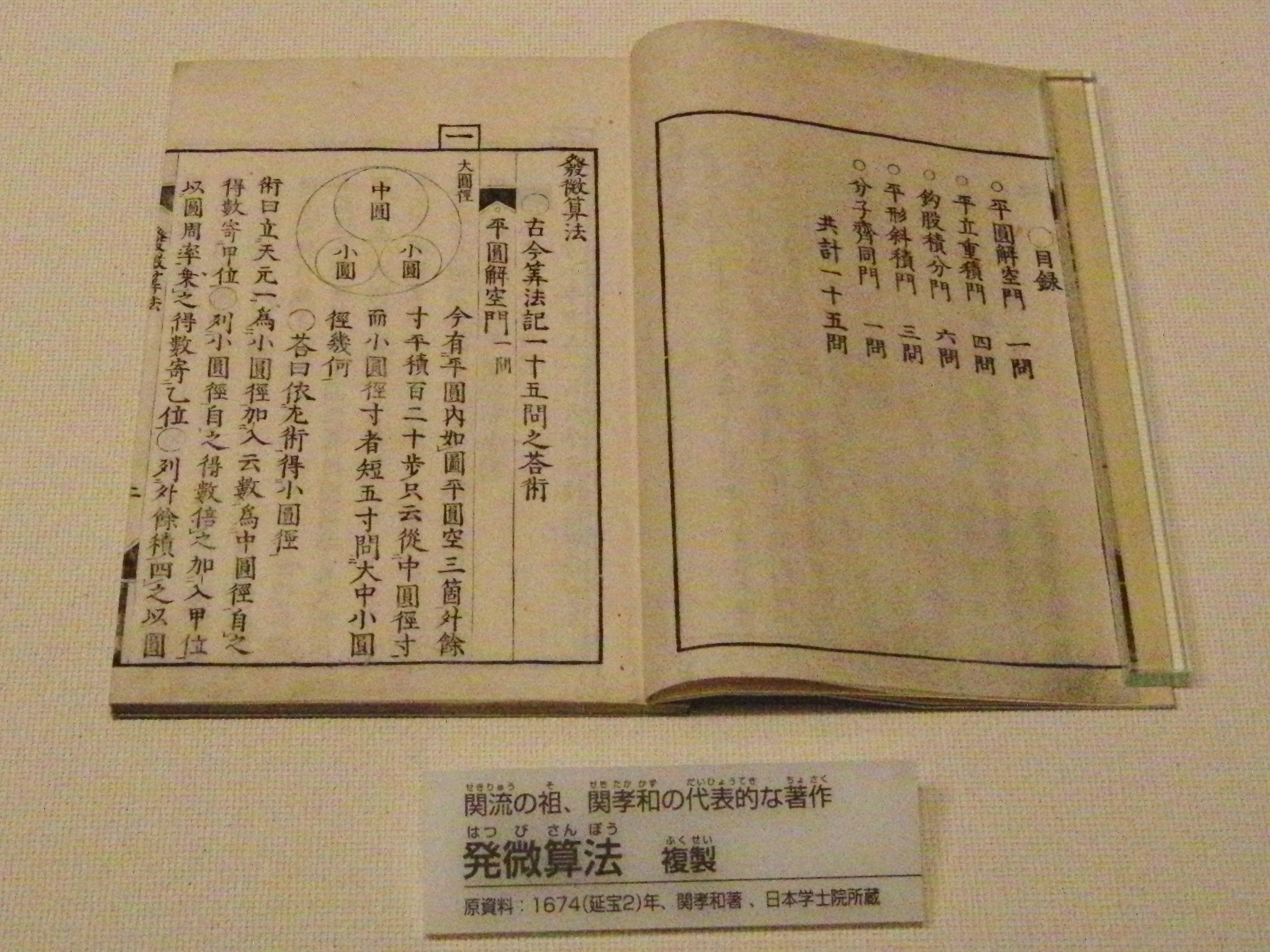
Replica of Hatsubi Sanpō exhibited in the National Museum of Nature and Science, Tokyo, Japan.

In 1671, Sawaguchi Kazuyuki (沢口 一之), a pupil of Hashimoto Masakazu (橋本 正数) in Osaka, published Kokon Sanpō Ki (古今算法記), in which he gave the first comprehensive account of Chinese algebra in Japan. He successfully applied it to problems suggested by his contemporaries. Before him, these problems were solved using arithmetical methods. In the end of the book, he challenged other mathematicians with 15 new problems, which require multi-variable algebraic equations.

In 1674, Seki published Hatsubi Sanpō (発微算法), giving solutions to all the 15 problems. The method he used is called bōsho-hō. He introduced the use of kanji to represent unknowns and variables in equations. Although it was possible to represent equations of an arbitrary degree (he once treated the 1458th degree) with negative coefficients, there were no symbols corresponding to parentheses, equality, or division. For example, $ax+b$ could also mean $ax+b=0$. Later, the system was improved by other mathematicians, and in the end it became as expressive as the ones developed in Europe.

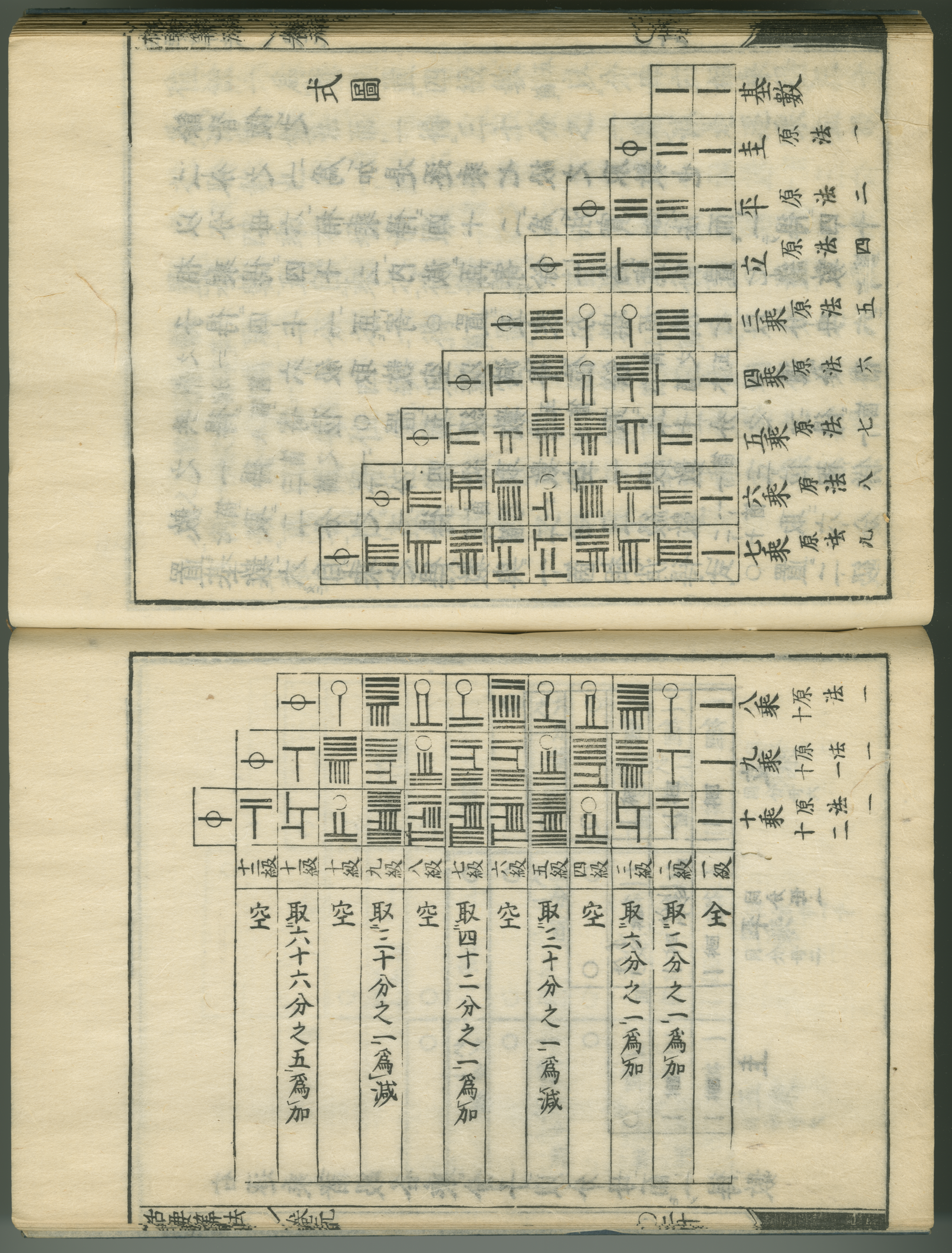
A page from Seki's Katsuyō Sanpō (1712), tabulating binomial coefficients and Bernoulli numbers

In his book of 1674, however, Seki gave only single-variable equations resulting from elimination, but no account of the process at all, nor his new system of algebraic symbols. There were a few errors in the first edition. A mathematician in Hashimoto's school criticized the work, saying "only three out of 15 are correct." In 1678, Tanaka Yoshizane (田中 由真), who was from Hashimoto's school and was active in Kyoto, authored Sanpō Meiki (算法明記), and gave new solutions to Sawaguchi's 15 problems, using his version of multivariable algebra, similar to Seki's. To answer criticism, in 1685, Takebe Katahiro (建部 賢弘), one of Seki's pupils, published Hatsubi Sanpō Genkai (発微算法諺解), notes on Hatsubi Sanpō, in which he showed in detail the process of elimination using algebraic symbols.

The effect of the introduction of the new symbolism was not restricted to algebra. With it, mathematicians at that time became able to express mathematical results in more general and abstract way. They concentrated on the study of elimination of variables.

=== Elimination theory ===
In 1683, Seki pushed ahead with elimination theory, based on resultants, in the Kaifukudai no Hō (解伏題之法). To express the resultant, he developed the notion of the determinant. While in his manuscript the formula for 5×5 matrices is obviously wrong, being always 0, in his later publication, Taisei Sankei (大成算経), written in 1683–1710 with Katahiro Takebe (建部 賢弘) and his brothers, a correct and general formula (Laplace's formula for the determinant) appears.

Tanaka came up with the same idea independently. An indication appeared in his book of 1678: some of equations after elimination are the same as resultant. In Sanpō Funkai (算法紛解) (1690?), he explicitly described the resultant and applied it to several problems. In 1690, Izeki Tomotoki (井関 知辰), a mathematician active in Osaka but not in Hashimoto's school, published Sanpō Hakki (算法発揮), in which he gave resultant and Laplace's formula of determinant for the n×n case. The relationships between these works are not clear. Seki developed his mathematics in competition with mathematicians in Osaka and Kyoto, at the cultural center of Japan.

In comparison with European mathematics, Seki's first manuscript was as early as Leibniz's first commentary on the subject, which treated matrices only up to the 3x3 case. The subject was forgotten in the West until Gabriel Cramer in 1750 was brought to it by the same motivations. Elimination theory equivalent to the wasan form was rediscovered by Étienne Bézout in 1764. Laplace's formula was established no earlier than 1750.

With elimination theory in hand, a large part of the problems treated in Seki's time became solvable in principle, given the Chinese tradition of geometry almost reduced to algebra. In practice, the method could founder under huge computational complexity. Yet this theory had a significant influence on the direction of development of wasan. After the elimination is complete, one is left to find numerically the real roots of a single-variable equation. Horner's method, though well known in China, was not transmitted to Japan in its final form. So Seki had to work it out by himself independently. He is sometimes credited with Horner's method, which is not historically correct. He also suggested an improvement to Horner's method: to omit higher order terms after some iterations. This practice happens to be the same as that of Newton–Raphson method, but with a completely different perspective. Neither he nor his pupils had, strictly speaking, the idea of derivative.

Seki also studied the properties of algebraic equations for assisting in numerical solution. The most notable of these are the conditions for the existence of multiple roots based on the discriminant, which is the resultant of a polynomial and its "derivative": His working definition of "derivative" was the O(h) -term in f(x + h), which was computed by the binomial theorem.

He obtained some evaluations of the number of real roots of a polynomial equation.

=== Calculus ===
Seki Takakazu developed enri (円理, “circle principles”), a mathematical system that addressed problems involving areas, volumes, and infinite series, broadly comparable in some aims to the problems later addressed by calculus in Europe. However Seki's investigations did not proceed from the same foundations as those used by Newton and leibniz in Europe.

=== Calculation of pi ===
Another of Seki's contributions was the rectification of the circle, i.e., the calculation of pi; he obtained a value for π that was correct to the 10th decimal place, using what is now called the Aitken's delta-squared process, rediscovered in the 20th century by Alexander Aitken.

== Legacy ==
The asteroid 7483 Sekitakakazu is named after Seki Takakazu.

== Selected works ==
In a statistical overview derived from writings by and about Seki Takakazu, OCLC/WorldCat encompasses roughly 50+ works in 50+ publications in three languages and 100+ library holdings.

- 1683 – Kenpu no Hō (驗符之法) OCLC 045626660
- 1712 – Katsuyō Sanpō (括要算法) OCLC 049703813
- Seki Takakazu Zenshū (關孝和全集) OCLC 006343391, collected works

== Gallery ==
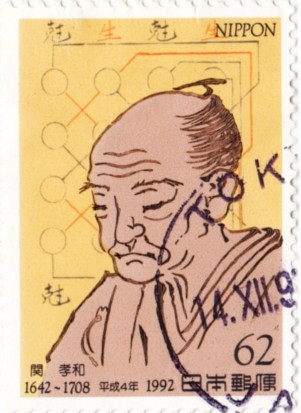
Seki on a 1992 stamp, taken from an Edo era ink drawing

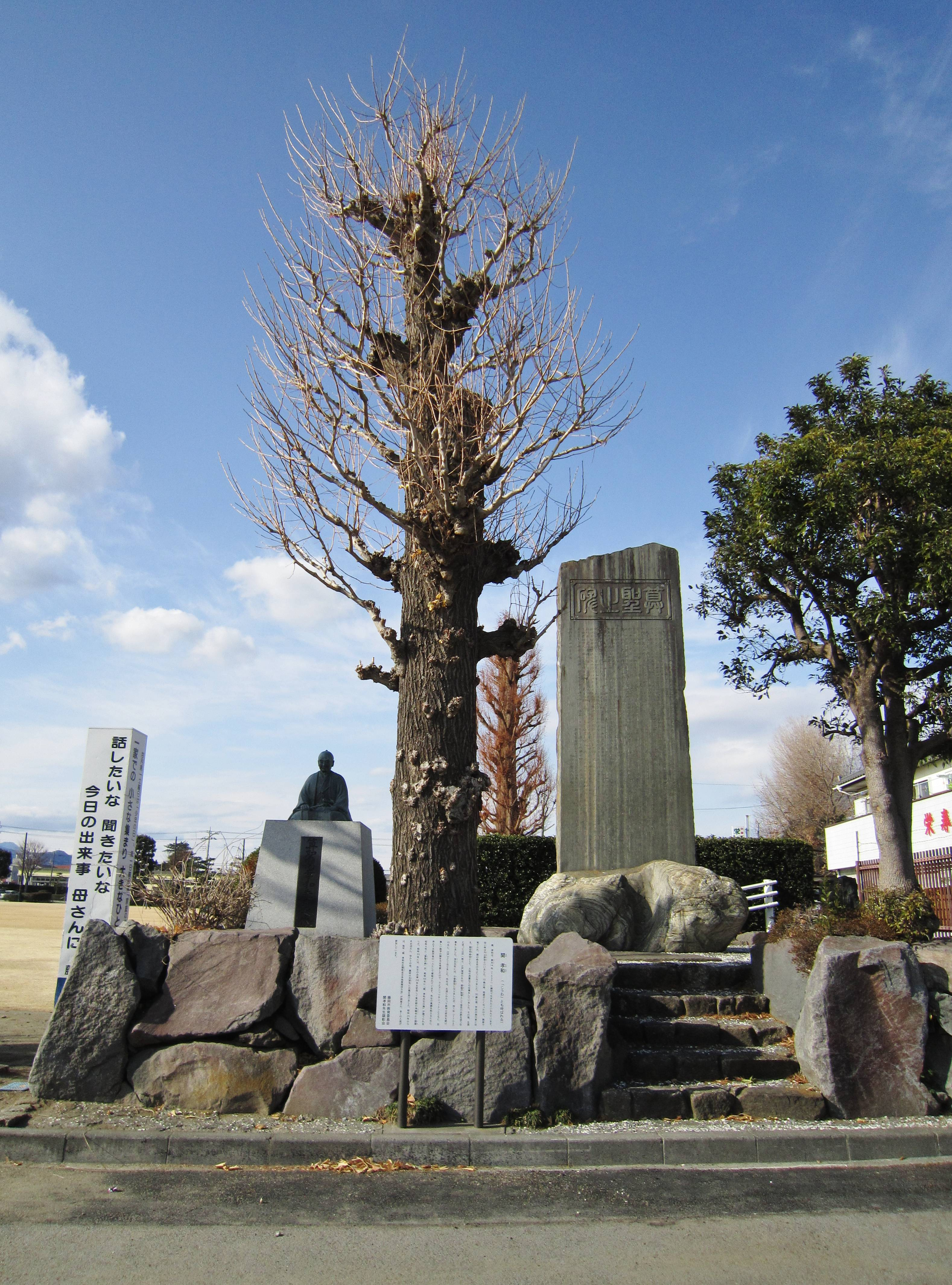
Memorial to Seki, with stele and statue

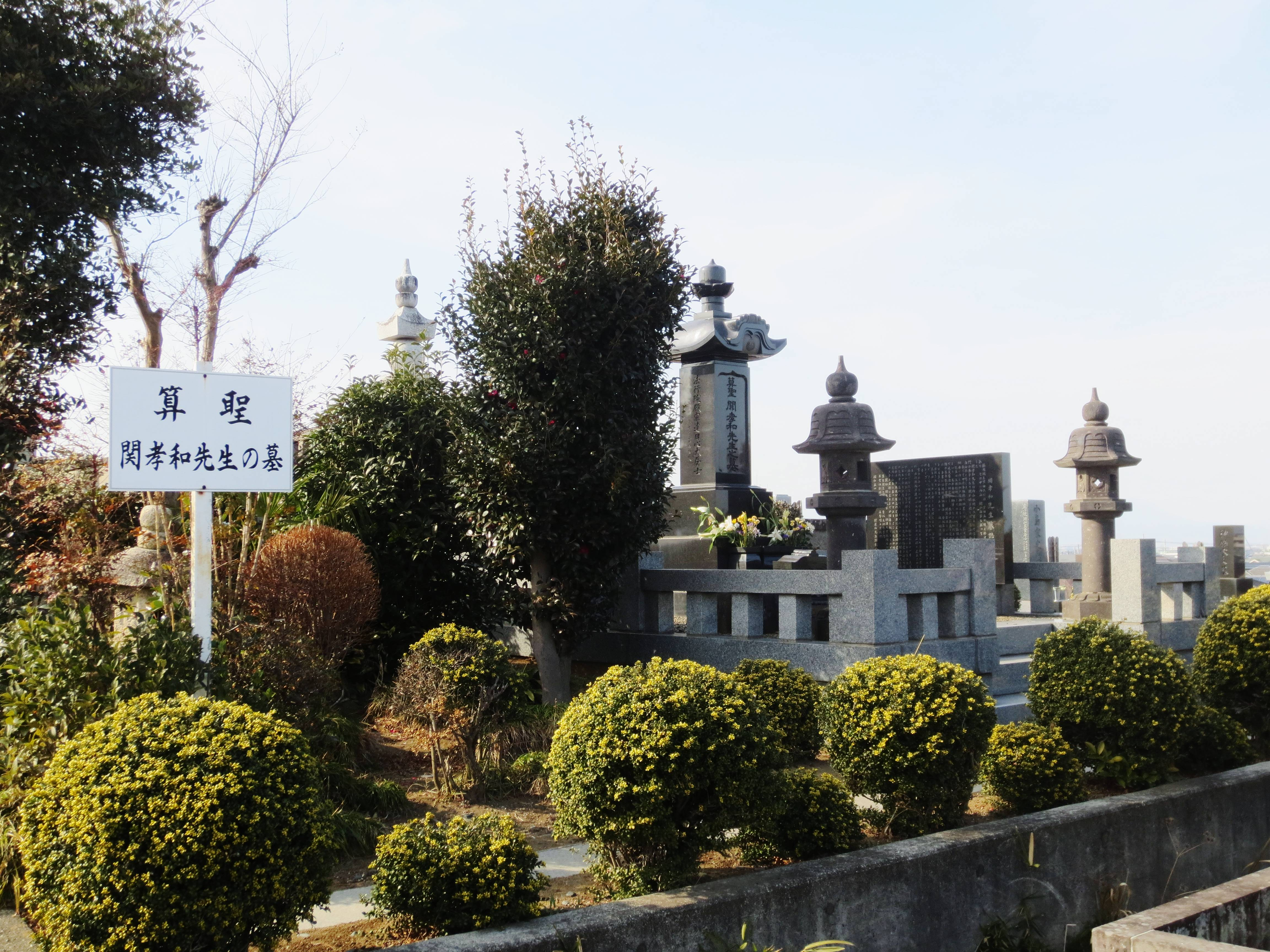

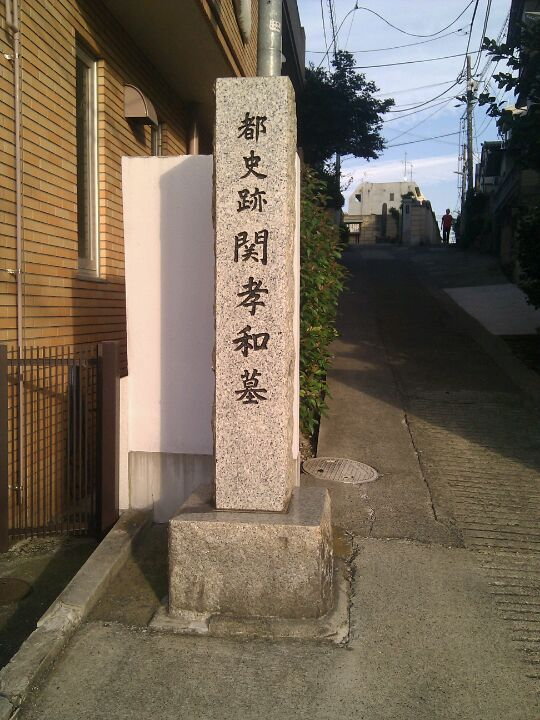
Seki's grave marker outside Jyōrin-ji temple in Tokyo

== See also ==
- Japanese mathematics
- Napkin ring problem
- Sangaku, the custom of presenting mathematical problems, carved in wood tablets, to the public in Shinto shrines
- Soroban, a Japanese abacus
