= Sangaku =

Wooden tablets inscribed with geometrical theorems in Edo Japan

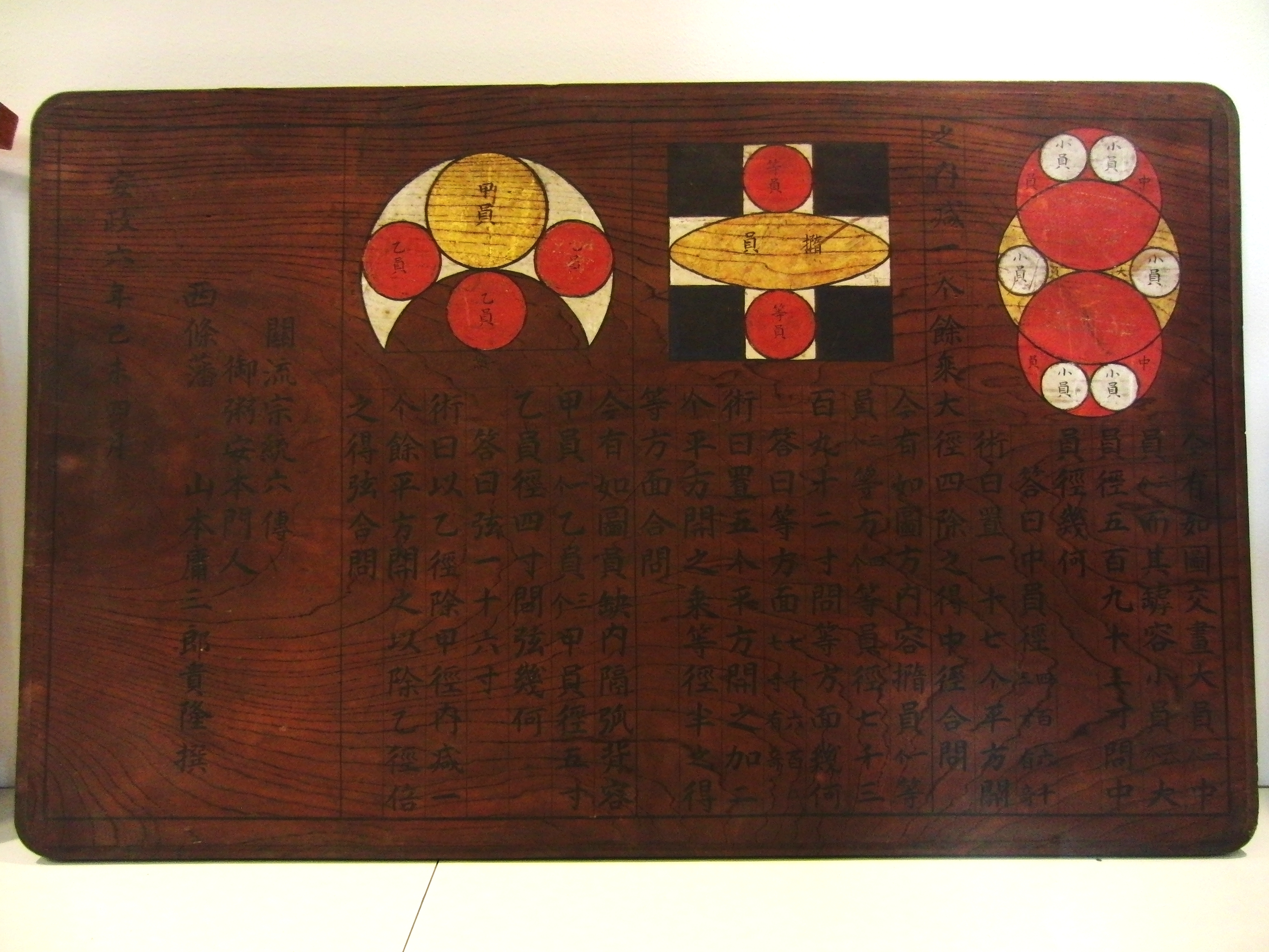
A sangaku dedicated to Konnoh Hachimangu (Shibuya, Tokyo) in 1859.

Sangaku or san gaku (Japanese: 算額, lit. 'calculation tablet') are Japanese geometrical problems or theorems on wooden tablets which were placed as offerings at Shinto shrines or Buddhist temples during the Edo period by members of all social classes.

== History ==
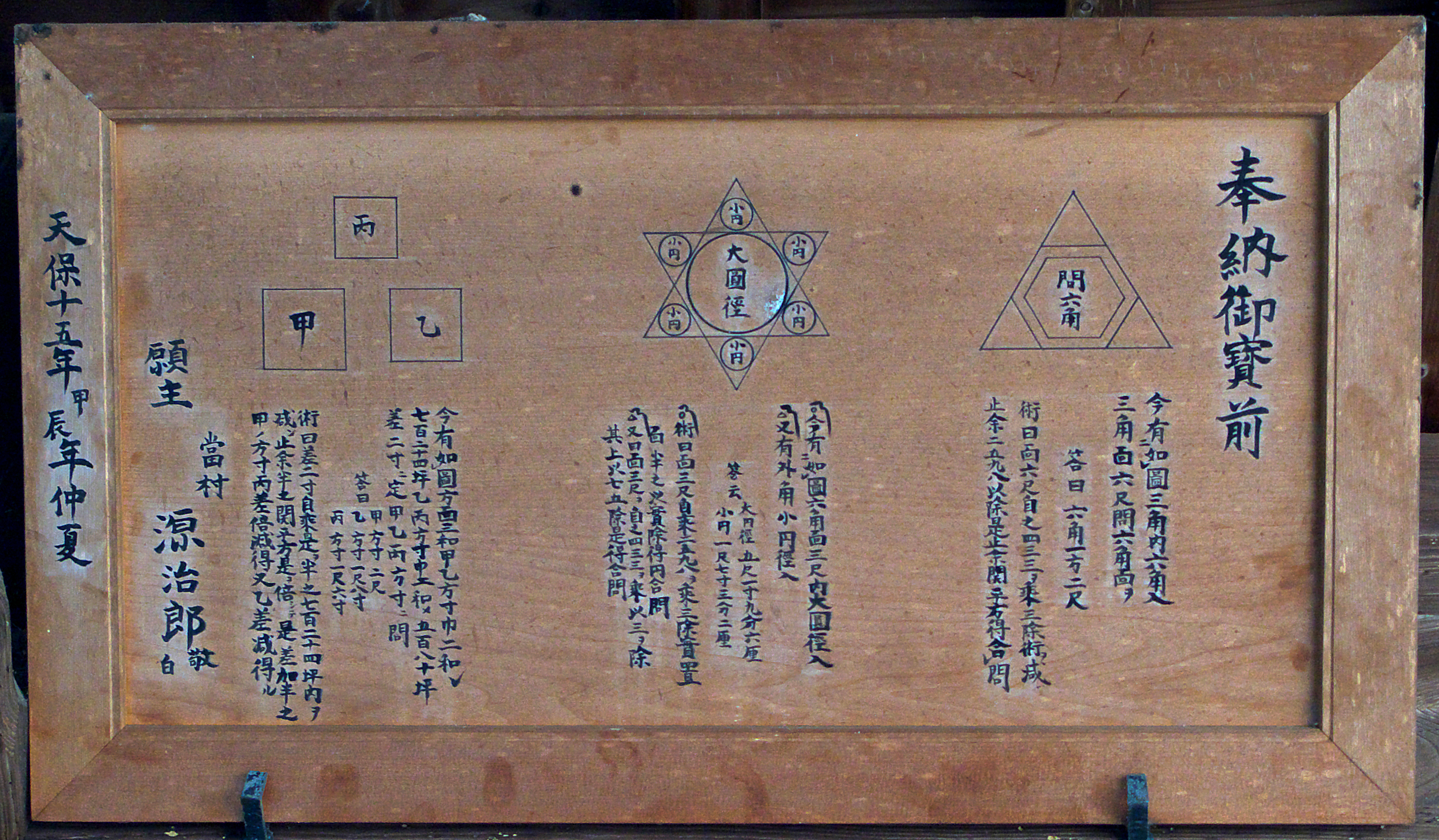
A sangaku dedicated at Emmanji Temple in Nara

The sangaku were painted in color on wooden tablets (ema) and hung in the precincts of Buddhist temples and Shinto shrines as offerings to the kami and buddhas, as challenges to the congregants, or as displays of the solutions to questions. Many of these tablets were lost during the period of modernization that followed the Edo period, but around nine hundred are known to remain.

Fujita Kagen (1765–1821), a Japanese mathematician of prominence, published the first collection of sangaku problems, his Shimpeki Sampo (Mathematical problems Suspended from the Temple) in 1790, and in 1806 a sequel, the Zoku Shimpeki Sampo.

During this period Japan applied strict regulations to commerce and foreign relations for western countries so the tablets were created using Japanese mathematics, developed in parallel to western mathematics. For example, the connection between an integral and its derivative (the fundamental theorem of calculus) was unknown, so sangaku problems on areas and volumes were solved by expansions in infinite series and term-by-term calculation.

== Select examples ==
The smallest distinct integer solution to the sangaku puzzle in which three circles touch each other and share a tangent line.

r_{middle}	r_{left}	r_{right}
1	4	4
4	9	36
9	16	144
16	25	400
72	200	450
144	441	784
- The six primitive triplets of integer radii up to 1000

- A typical problem, which is presented on an 1824 tablet in Gunma Prefecture, covers the relationship of three touching circles with a common tangent, a special case of Descartes' theorem. Given the size of the two outer large circles, what is the size of the small circle between them? The answer is:

$$\frac{1}{\sqrt{r_\text{middle}}} = \frac{1}{\sqrt{r_\text{left}}} + \frac{1}{\sqrt{r_\text{right}}}.$$

(See also Ford circle.)

- Soddy's hexlet, thought previously to have been first discovered in the west in 1937, had been discovered on a sangaku dating from 1822.
- One sangaku problem from Sawa Masayoshi and other from Jihei Morikawa were solved only recently.

== See also ==
- Equal incircles theorem
- Japanese theorem for concyclic polygons
- Japanese theorem for concyclic quadrilaterals
- Problem of Apollonius
- Recreational mathematics
- Seki Takakazu
