= Soroban =

Japanese abacus

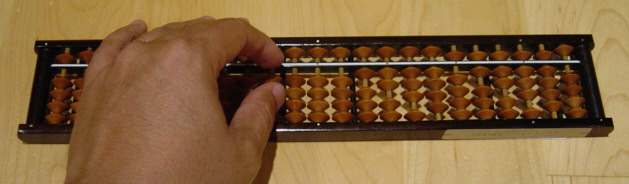
A modern soroban. The right side of the soroban represents the number 1234567890, each column indicating one digit, with the lower beads representing "ones" and the upper beads "fives".

The soroban (算盤, そろばん; counting tray) is a Japanese abacus derived from Chinese suanpan. The Chinese abacus and its operation method was introduced into Japan after mid 15th century. Then Japanese mathematics developed a distinct methos and adjust Chinese suanpan into smaller ones.A soroban has five bead on each rod, one bead above and four beads below. It's used for calculation and still be employed and taught in Japan.

== Construction ==
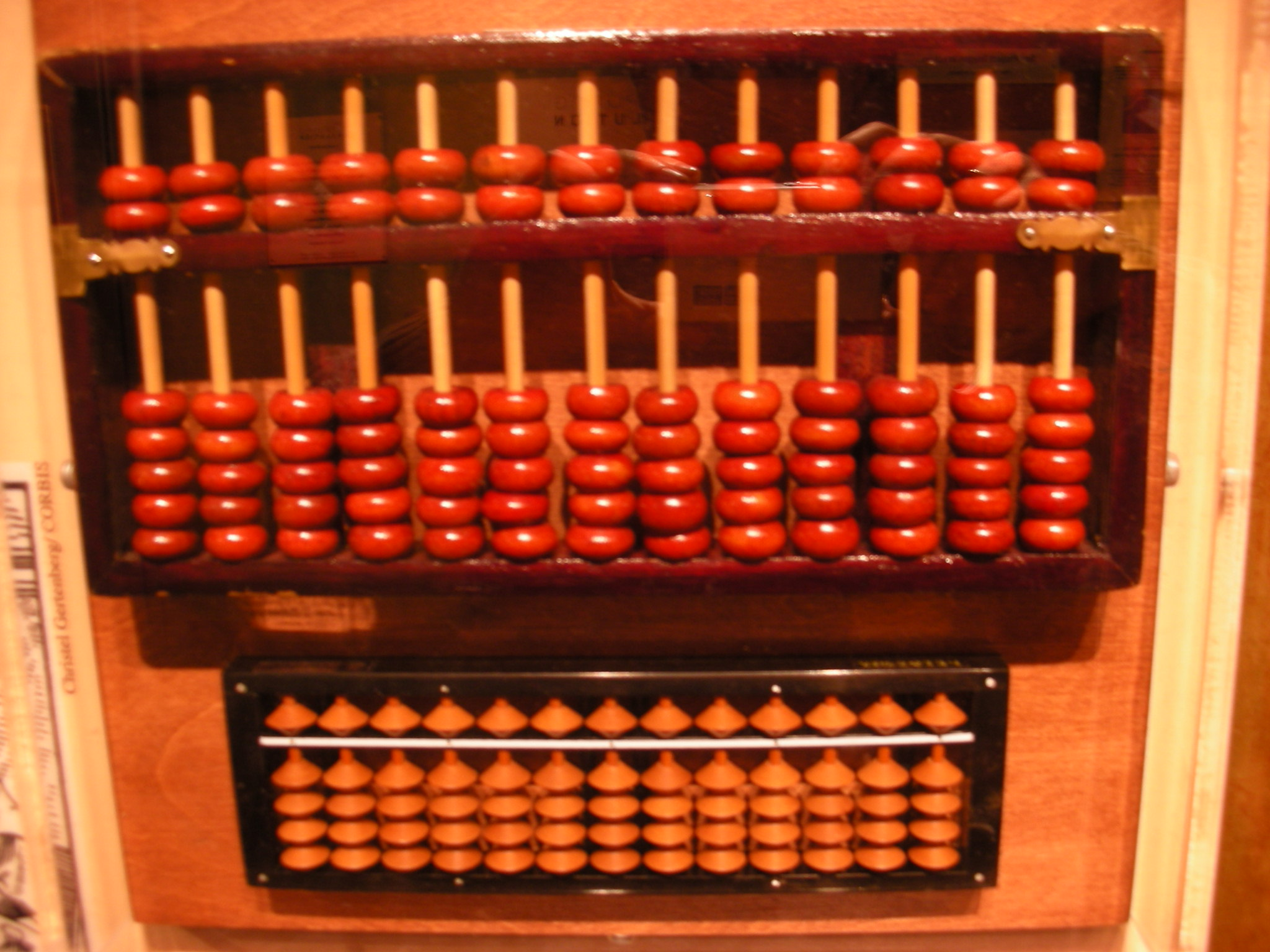
A suanpan (top) and a soroban (bottom). The two abaci seen here are of standard size and have thirteen rods each.

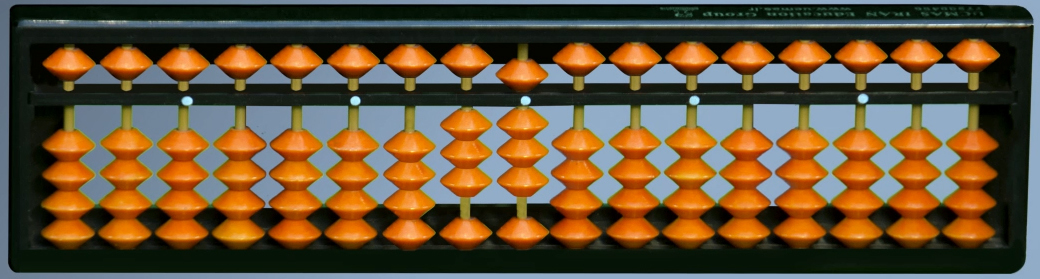
Another variant of soroban

The soroban is composed of an odd number of columns or rods, each having beads: one separate bead having a value of five, called go-dama (五玉, ごだま; "five-bead") and four beads each having a value of one, called ichi-dama (一玉, いちだま; "one-bead"). Each set of beads of each rod is divided by a bar known as a reckoning bar. The number and size of beads in each rod make a standard-sized 13-rod soroban much less bulky than a standard-sized suanpan of similar expressive power.

The number of rods in a soroban is always odd and never fewer than seven. Basic models usually have thirteen rods, but the number of rods on practical or standard models often increases to 21, 23, 27 or even 31, thus allowing calculation of more digits or representations of several different numbers at the same time. Each rod represents a digit, and a larger number of rods allows the representation of more digits, either in singular form or during operations.

The beads and rods are made of a variety of different materials. Most soroban made in Japan are made of wood and have wood, metal, rattan, or bamboo rods for the beads to slide on. The beads themselves are usually biconal (shaped like a double-cone). They are normally made of wood, although the beads of some soroban, especially those made outside Japan, can be marble, stone, or even plastic. The cost of a soroban is commensurate with the materials used in its construction.

One unique feature that sets the soroban apart from its Chinese cousin is a dot marking every third rod in a soroban. These are unit rods and any one of them is designated to denote the last digit of the whole number part of the calculation answer. Any number that is represented on rods to the right of this designated rod is part of the decimal part of the answer, unless the number is part of a division or multiplication calculation. Unit rods to the left of the designated one also aid in place value by denoting the groups in the number (such as thousands, millions, etc.). Suanpan usually do not have this feature.

== Usage ==
=== Representation of numbers ===
The soroban uses a bi-quinary coded decimal system, where each of the rods can represent a single digit from 0 to 9. By moving beads towards the reckoning bar, they are put in the "on" position; i.e., they assume value. For the "five bead" this means it is moved downwards, while "one beads" are moved upwards. In this manner, all digits from 0 to 9 can be represented by different configurations of beads, as shown below:

Representation of digits 0–9 on the soroban

These digits can subsequently be used to represent multiple-digit numbers. This is done in the same way as in Western, decimal notation: the rightmost digit represents units, the one to the left of it represents tens, etc. The number 8036, for instance, is represented by the following configuration:

8036, with the right-most rod with a dot chosen as the unit rod

The soroban user is free to choose which rod is used for the units; typically this will be one of the rods marked with a dot (see the 6 in the example above). Any digits to the right of the units represent decimals: tenths, hundredths, etc. In order to change 8036 into 80.36, for instance, the user places the digits in such a way that the 0 falls on a rod marked with a dot:

80.36, with the right-most rod with a dot chosen as the unit rod

=== Methods of operation ===
The methods of addition and subtraction on a soroban are basically the same as the equivalent operations on a suanpan, with basic addition and subtraction making use of a complementary number to add or subtract ten in carrying over.

There are many methods to perform both multiplication and division on a soroban, especially Chinese methods that came with the importation of the suanpan. The authority in Japan on the soroban, the Japan Abacus Committee, has recommended so-called standard methods for both multiplication and division which require only the use of the multiplication table. These methods were chosen for efficiency and speed in calculation.

Because the soroban developed through a reduction in the number of beads from seven, to six, and then to the present five, these methods can be used on the suanpan as well as on soroban produced before the 1930s, which have five "one" beads and one "five" bead.

The "five" beads methods for the olden soroban before the 1930s can be found here.

== Modern use ==
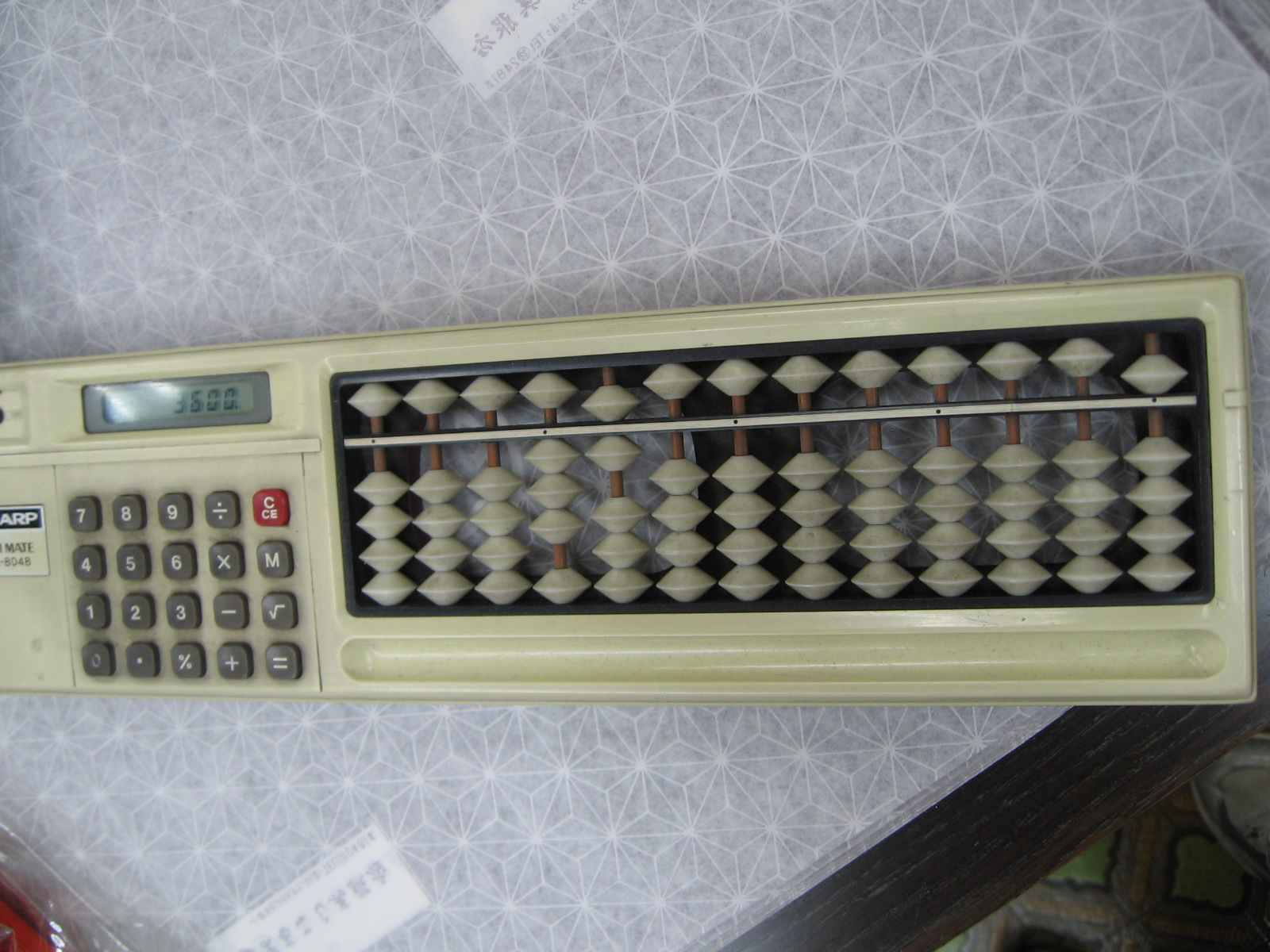
A dual soroban-calculator, Sharp Elsi Mate EL-8048 Sorokaru, produced from 1979

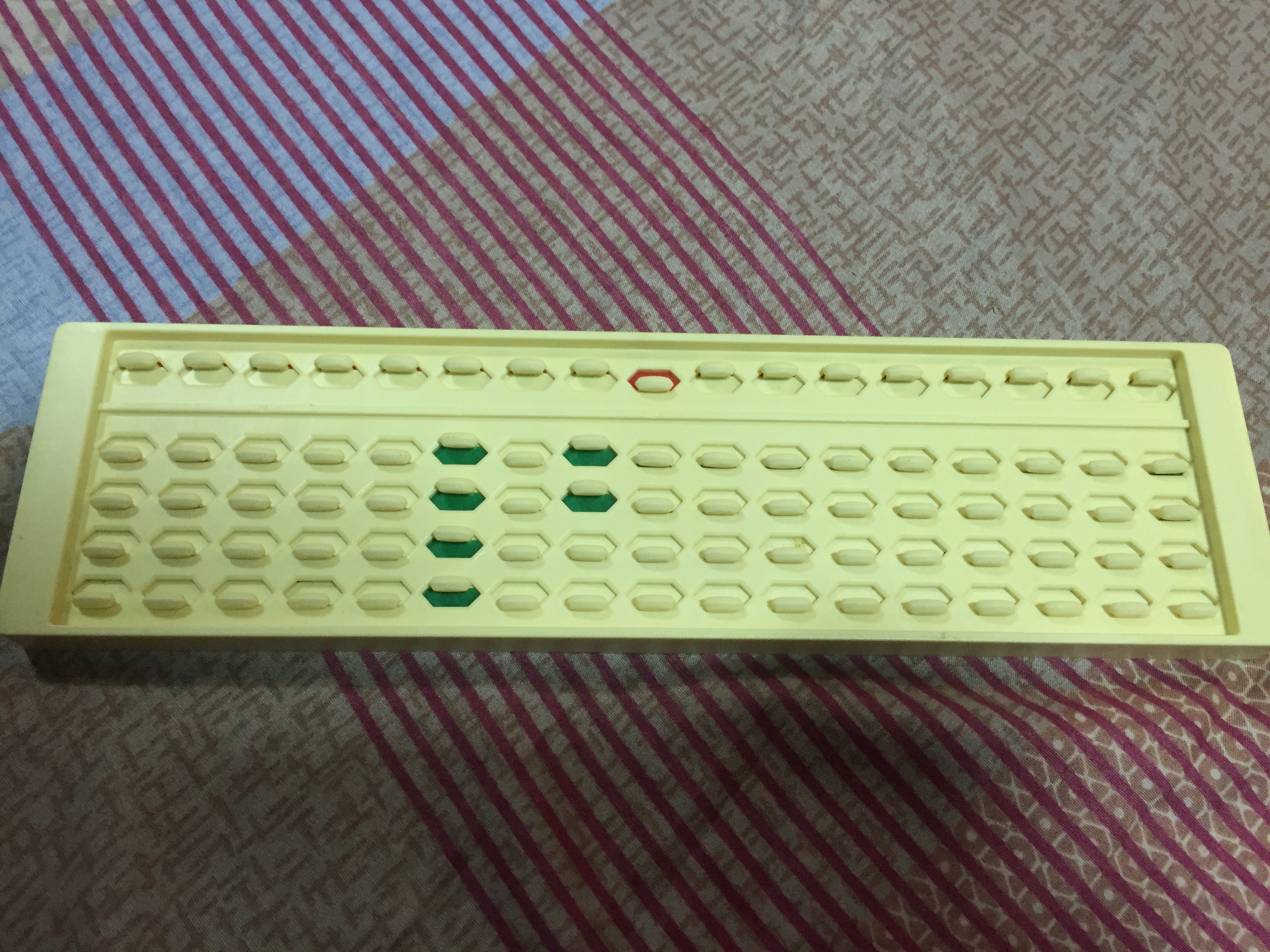
An abacus that uses colored sliders instead of beads. Red represents the value 5; green represents the value 1. The value in the abacus is 4025.

The Japanese abacus has been taught in school for over 500 years, deeply rooted in the value of learning the fundamentals as a form of art. However, the introduction of the West during the Meiji period and then again after World War II has gradually altered the Japanese education system. Now, the strive is for speed and turning out deliverables rather than understanding the subtle intricacies of the concepts behind the product. Calculators have since replaced sorobans, and elementary schools are no longer required to teach students how to use the soroban, though some do so by choice. The growing popularity of calculators within the context of Japanese modernization has driven the study of soroban from public schools to private after school classrooms. Where once it was an institutionally required subject in school for children grades 2 to 6, current laws have made keeping this art form and perspective on math practiced amongst the younger generations more lenient. Today, it shifted from a given to a game where one can take The Japanese Chamber of Commerce and Industry's examination in order to obtain a certificate and license.

There are six levels of mastery, starting from sixth-grade (very skilled) all the way up to first-grade (for those who have completely mastered the use of the soroban). Those obtaining at least a third-grade certificate/license are qualified to work in public corporations.

The soroban is still taught in some primary schools as a way to visualize and grapple with mathematical concepts. The practice of soroban includes the teacher reciting a string of numbers (addition, subtraction, multiplication, and division) in a song-like manner where at the end, the answer is given by the teacher. This helps train the ability to follow the tempo given by the teacher while remaining calm and accurate. In this way, it reflects on a fundamental aspect of Japanese culture of practicing meditative repetition in every aspect of life. Primary school students often bring two soroban to class, one with the modern configuration and the other one having the older configuration of one heavenly bead and five earth beads.

Shortly after the beginning of one's soroban studies, drills to enhance mental calculation, known as anzan (暗算, "blind calculation") in Japanese, are incorporated. Students are asked to solve problems mentally by visualizing the soroban and working out the solution by moving the beads theoretically in one's mind. The mastery of anzan is one reason why, despite the access to handheld calculators, some parents still send their children to private tutors to learn the soroban.

The soroban is also the basis for two kinds of abaci developed for the use of blind people. One is the toggle-type abacus wherein flip switches are used instead of beads. The second is the Cranmer abacus which has circular beads, longer rods, and a leather backcover so the beads do not slide around when in use.

== Brief history ==
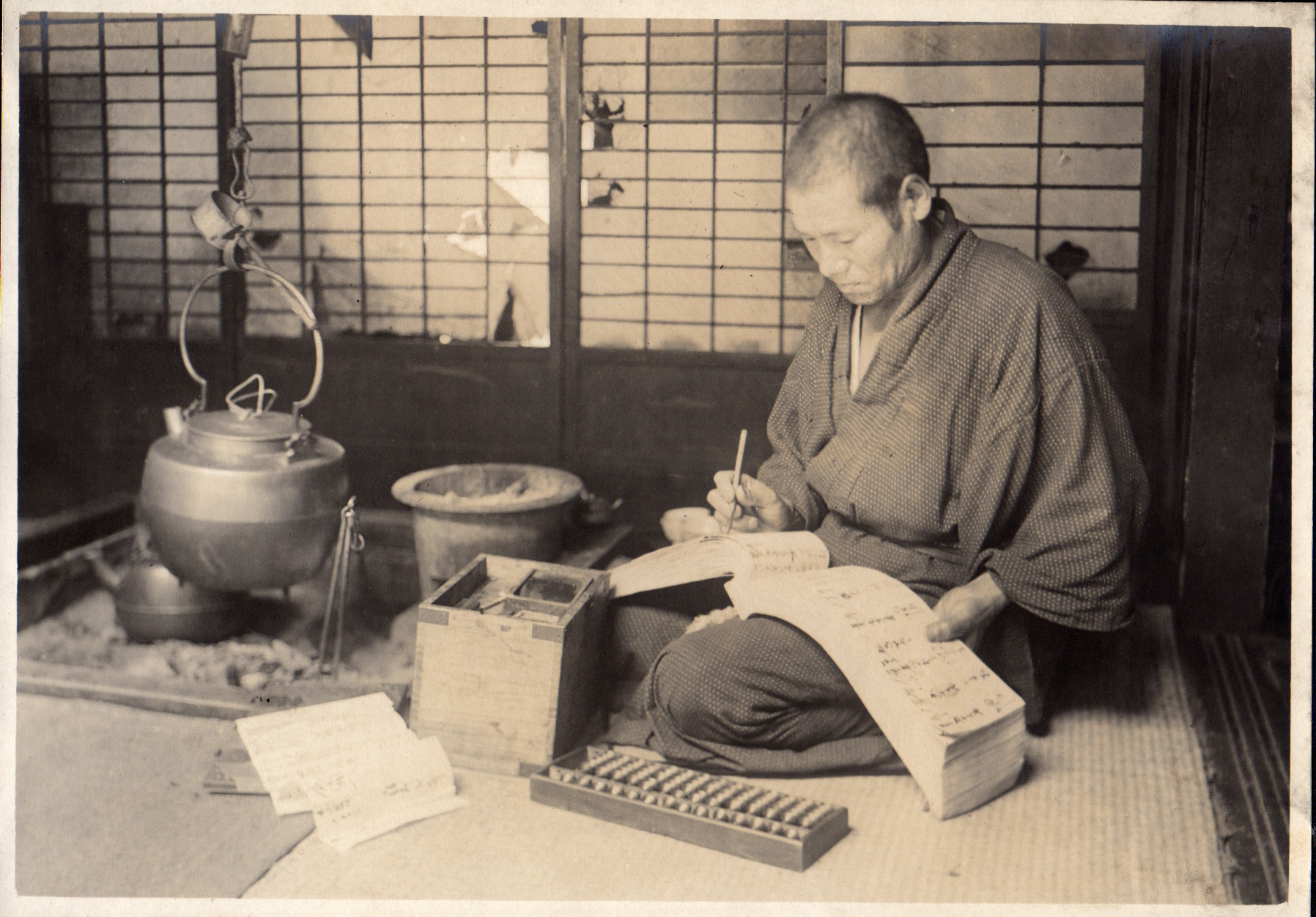
A man writing in a ledger with the help of a soroban. Taisho period, 1914

The soroban's physical resemblance is derived from the suanpan but the number of beads is identical to the Roman abacus, which had four beads below and one at the top.

Most historians on the soroban agree that it has its roots on the suanpan's importation to Japan via the Korean peninsula around the 14th century. (Note: Some sources give a date of introduction of around 1600.) When the suanpan first became native to Japan as the soroban (with its beads modified for ease of use), it had two heavenly beads and five earth beads. But the soroban was not widely used until the 17th century, although it was in use by Japanese merchants since its introduction. Once the soroban became popularly known, several Japanese mathematicians, including Seki Kōwa, studied it extensively. These studies became evident on the improvements on the soroban itself and the operations used on it.

In the construction of the soroban itself, the number of beads had begun to decrease. In around 1850, one heavenly bead was removed from the suanpan configuration of two heavenly beads and five earth beads. This new Japanese configuration existed concurrently with the suanpan until the start of the Meiji era, after which the suanpan fell completely out of use. In 1891, Irie Garyū further removed one earth bead, forming the modern configuration of one heavenly bead and four earth beads. This configuration was later reintroduced in 1930 and became popular in the 1940s.

Also, when the suanpan was imported to Japan, it came along with its division table. The method of using the table was called kyūkihō (九帰法, "nine returning method") in Japanese, while the table itself was called the hassan (八算, "eight calculation"). The division table used along with the suanpan was more popular because of the original hexadecimal configuration of Japanese currency. But because using the division table was complicated and it should be remembered along with the multiplication table, it soon fell out in 1935 (soon after the soroban's present form was reintroduced in 1930), with a so-called standard method replacing the use of the division table. This standard method of division, recommended today by the Japan Abacus Committee, is in fact an old method which used counting rods, first suggested by mathematician Momokawa Chubei in 1645, and therefore had to compete with the division table during the latter's heyday.

== Comparison with the electric calculator ==
On November 11, 1946, a contest was held in Tokyo between the Japanese soroban, used by Kiyoshi Matsuzaki, and an electric calculator, operated by US Army Private Thomas Nathan Wood. The basis for scoring in the contest was speed and accuracy of results in all four basic arithmetic operations and a problem which combines all four. The soroban won 4 to 1, with the electric calculator prevailing in multiplication.

About the event, the Nippon Times newspaper reported that "Civilization ... tottered" that day, while the Stars and Stripes newspaper described the soroban's "decisive" victory as an event in which "the machine age took a step backward....".

The breakdown of results is as follows:

- Five additions problems for each heat, each problem consisting of 50 three- to six-digit numbers. The soroban won in two successive heats.
- Five subtraction problems for each heat, each problem having six- to eight-digit minuends and subtrahends. The soroban won in the first and third heats; the second heat was a no contest.
- Five multiplication problems, each problem having five- to 12-digit factors. The calculator won in the first and third heats; the soroban won on the second.
- Five division problems, each problem having five- to 12-digit dividends and divisors. The soroban won in the first and third heats; the calculator won on the second.
- A composite problem which the soroban answered correctly and won on this round. It consisted of:
  - An addition problem involving 30 six-digit numbers
  - Three subtraction problems, each with two six-digit numbers
  - Three multiplication problems, each with two figures containing a total of five to twelve digits
  - Three division problems, each with two figures containing a total of five to twelve digits

== See also ==
- Bi-quinary coded decimal
- Chisanbop
- List of Traditional Crafts of Japan
- Quinary (pental system)
