= Circle theorem =

Circle theorem may refer to:

- Any of many theorems related to the circle; often taught as a group in GCSE mathematics. These include:
  - Inscribed angle theorem.
  - Thales' theorem, if A, B and C are points on a circle where the line AC is a diameter of the circle, then the angle ∠ABC is a right angle.
  - Alternate segment theorem.
  - Ptolemy's theorem.
- The Milne-Thomson circle theorem in fluid dynamics.
- Five circles theorem
- Six circles theorem
- Seven circles theorem
- Gershgorin circle theorem

== See also ==
- Clifford's circle theorems
- Descartes's theorem also known as 'kissing circles' or 'Soddy circles' theorem
- List of circle topics
