= Graphic communication =

Communication using graphic elements

Graphic communication is communication using graphic and visual elements. These elements include symbols such as glyphs and icons, images such as drawings and photographs, typography and fonts, and can include the passive contributions of substrate, colour, and surroundings. It is the process of creating, producing, and distributing material incorporating words and images to convey data, concepts, and emotions.

The field of graphics communications encompasses all phases of the graphic communications processes from origination of the idea (design, layout, and typography) through reproduction, finishing, and distribution of two- or three-dimensional products or electronic transmission. Although graphic communication is similar to graphic design in some aspects, there are significant differences between the two. Graphic communication focuses more on the client impact through communication via visuals of different formats. Graphic design focuses more on creating art and designing graphics that will be used by companies.

== Overview ==
Graphic Communication focuses on the technical aspects of producing and distributing items of visual communication. This includes technical aspects associated with the production of tangible items such as books, magazines, and packaging, as well as digital items such as e-newsletters, interactive apps, websites, video, and virtual reality applications.

Graphic communication involves the use of visual material to relate ideas such as drawings, photographs, slides, and sketches. The drawings of plans and refinements, and a rough map sketched to show the way, could be considered graphical communication.

Graphic Design focuses on developing concepts and creating visuals. This includes instruction regarding elements and principles of design, typography, image editing, web and video production, etc.

Any medium that uses a graphics to aid in conveying a message, instruction, or an idea is involved in graphical communication. One of the most widely used forms of graphical communication is the drawing.

== History ==
In the prehistoric period, communication was done visually and aurally and involved touching, either delicately or forcefully, as well as movements and gestures. The earliest graphics known to anthropologists studying prehistoric periods are cave paintings and markings on boulders, bone, ivory, and antlers, which were created during the Upper Paleolithic period from 40,000 to 10,000 B.C. or earlier. Many of these played a major role in geometry. They used graphics to represent their mathematical theories, such as the Circle Theorem and the Pythagorean theorem.

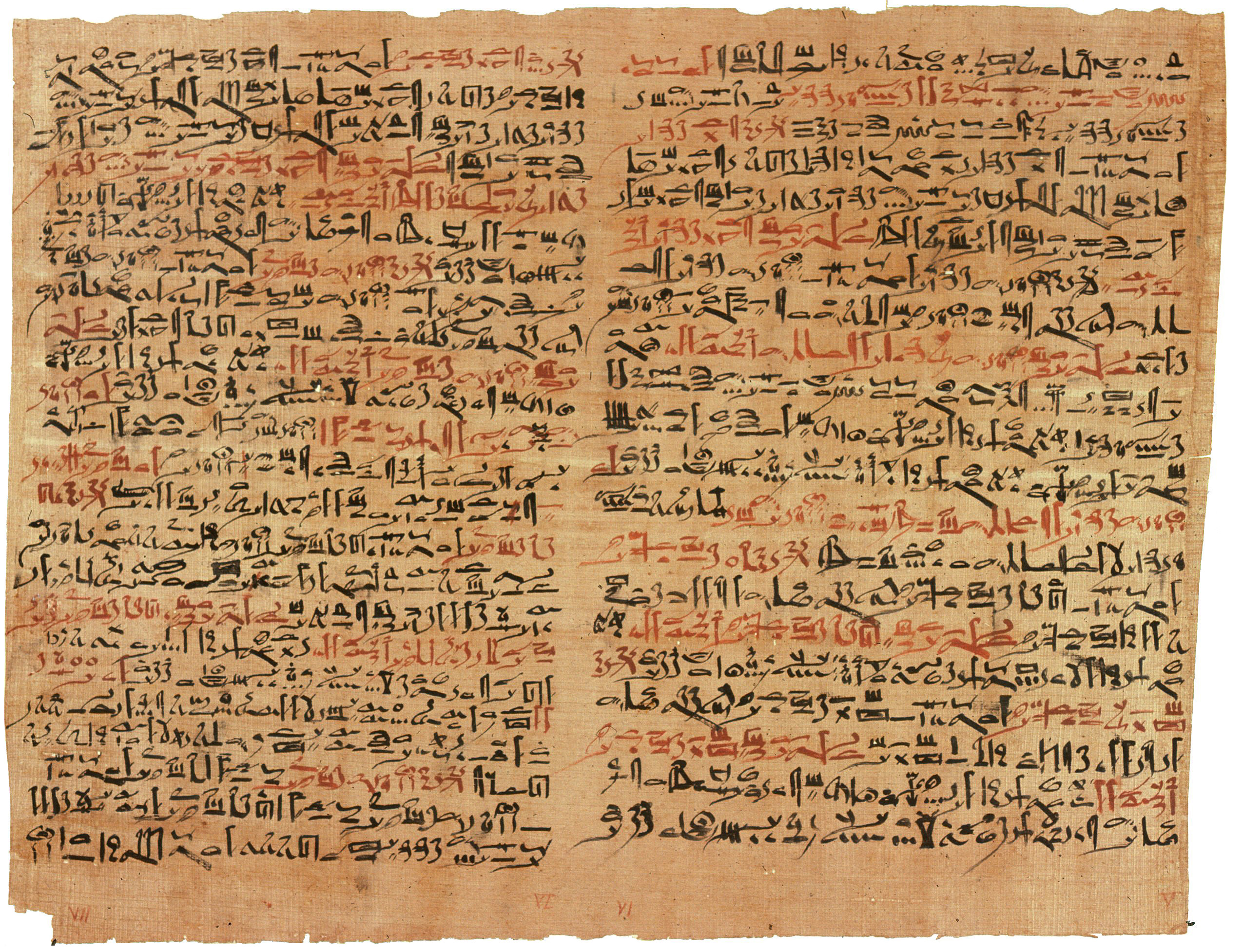
Papyrus made from Egyptians

The development of paper was a major step in the evolution of graphic communication as it is known today. The earlier forms of paper can be dated back to China. In these times, people wrote on bamboo and wooden strips with bamboo pencils. Eventually, this developed into the Egyptians making paper from papyrus. The process of making paper was derived from Ancient China and was later discovered by Europe. Once discovered, the process of paper making was refined to modern paper making. It involves a long process of fiber breakdown, pulping, and adding certain substances to improve the quality, strength, color, and brightness of paper.

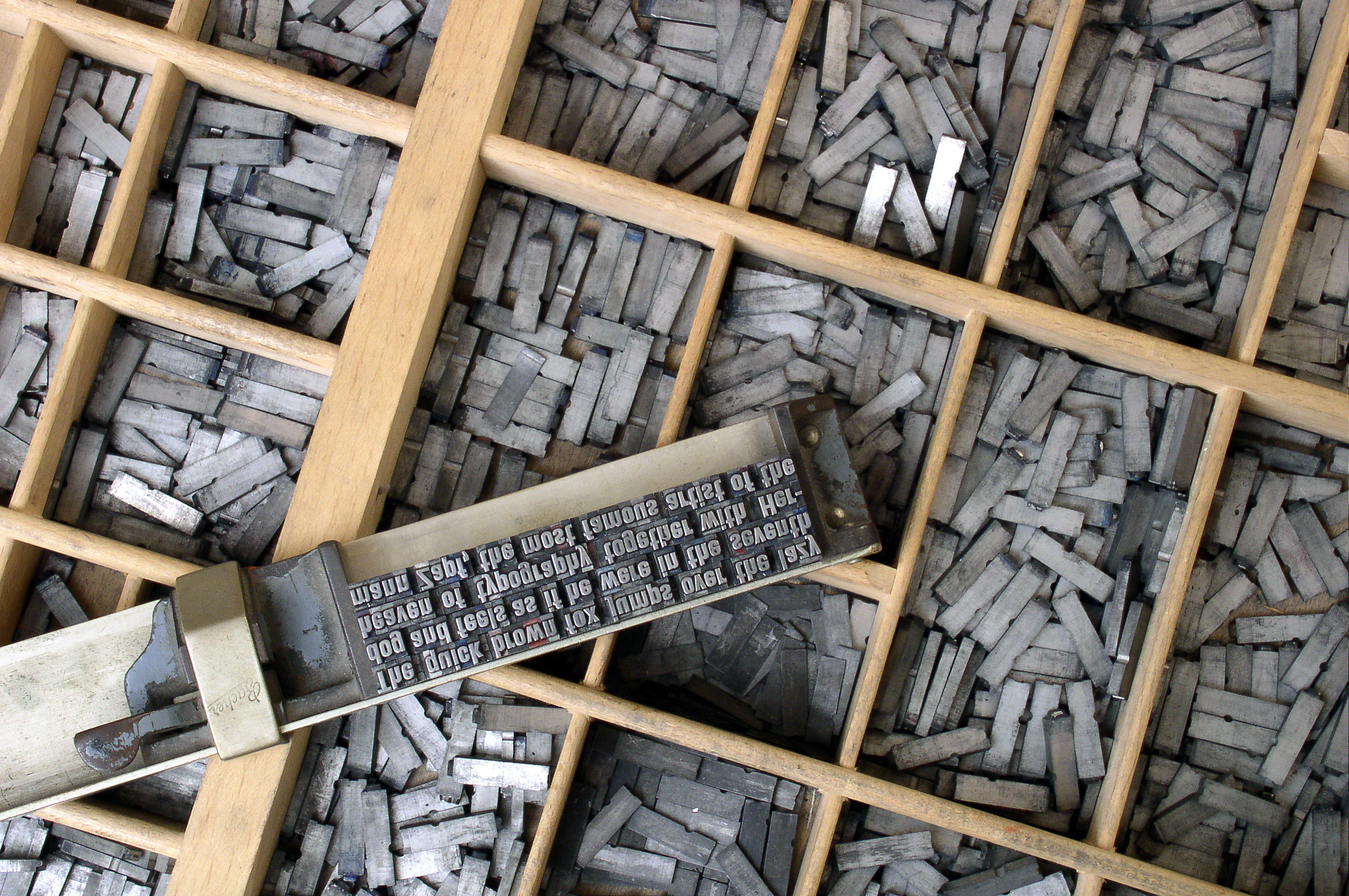
This is an example of moveable type

Along with the development of paper, the advancement of type is important in the history of graphic communication. Without the right typeface or font, communication would be harder and less efficient. The earliest writing can be found in Ancient Mesopotamia, which consisted of pictographic drawings, numerals, and personal names. This form of writing led to the development of the Egyptian hieroglyphics. Egyptians retained pictographic communication, using symbols and drawings to depict objects or beings. Eventually, the creation of movable type, invented by Bi Sheng in Ancient China, transformed the way type was used. Type has since evolved to modern type, which features different typefaces and easier ways of typing.

== Graphic communication topics ==
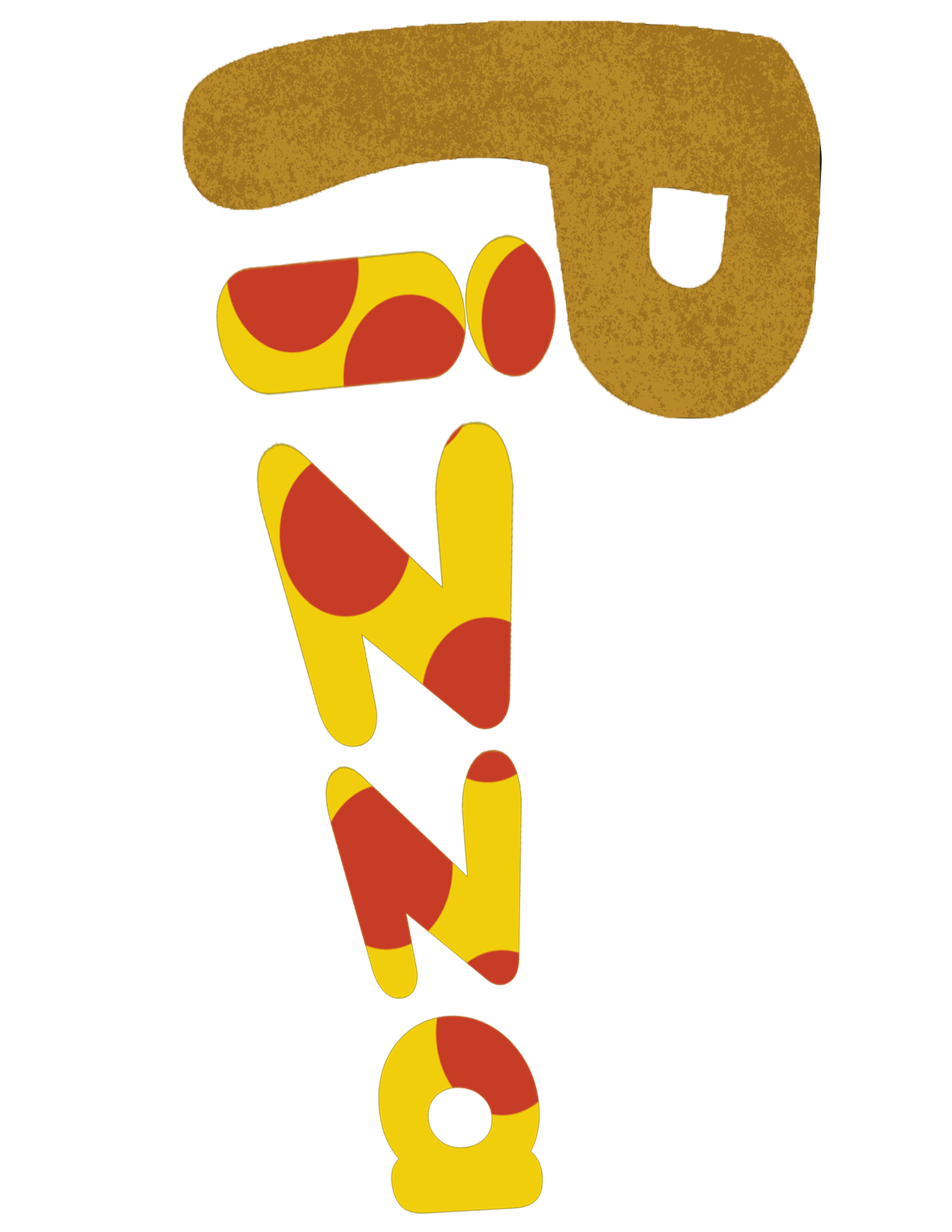
This image combines different techniques to create this graphic.

=== Graphics ===
Graphics are visual presentations on some surface, such as a wall, canvas, computer screen, paper, or stone, to brand, inform, illustrate, or entertain. Examples are photographs, drawings, line art, graphs, diagrams, typography, numbers, symbols, geometric designs, maps, engineering drawings, or other images. Graphics often combine text, illustration, and color. Graphic design may consist of the deliberate selection, creation, or arrangement of typography alone, as in a brochure, flier, poster, website, or book without any other element. Clarity or effective communication may be the objective. Association with other cultural elements may be sought, or merely the creation of a distinctive style.

Graphics can be functional or artistic. The latter can be a recorded version, such as a photograph, or an interpretation by a scientist to highlight essential features, or an artist, in which case the distinction with imaginary graphics may become blurred.

=== Communication ===
Communication is the process whereby information is imparted by a sender to a receiver via a medium. It requires that all parties share a communicative common ground. There are auditory means, such as speaking, singing and sometimes tone of voice, and nonverbal, physical means, such as body language, sign language, paralanguage, touch, eye contact, by using writing. Communication is defined as a process by which we assign and convey meaning in an attempt to create shared understanding. This process requires a vast repertoire of skills in intrapersonal and interpersonal processing, listening, observing, speaking, questioning, analyzing, and evaluating. If you use these processes, they are developmental and transfer to all areas of life: home, school, community, work, and beyond. It is through communication that collaboration and cooperation occur.

=== Visual communication ===
Visual communication as the name suggests is communication through visual aid. It is the conveyance of ideas and information in forms that can be read or looked upon. Primarily associated with two dimensional images, it includes: signs, typography, drawing, graphic design, illustration, color and electronic resources. It solely relies on vision. It is a form of communication with a visual effect. It explores the idea that a visual message with text has a greater power to inform, educate or persuade a person. It is communication by presenting information through visual form. The evaluation of a good visual design is based on measuring audience comprehension, not on aesthetic or artistic preference. There are no universally agreed-upon principles of beauty and ugliness. There exists a variety of ways to present information visually, like gestures, body languages, video and TV. Here, the focus is on the presentation of text, pictures, diagrams, photos, and related materials on a computer display. The term visual presentation refers to the actual presentation of information. Recent research in the field has focused on web design and graphically oriented usability. Graphic designers use visual communication methods in their professional practice.

=== Communication design ===
Communication design is a mixed discipline between design and information development which is concerned with how intermission such as printed, crafted, electronic media or presentations communicate with people. A communication design approach is not only concerned with developing the message aside from the aesthetics in media, but also with creating new media channels to ensure the message reaches the target audience. Communication design seeks to attract, inspire, create desires and motivate the people to respond to messages, with a view to making a favorable impact to the bottom line of the commissioning body, which can be either to build a brand, move sales, or for humanitarian purposes. Its process involves strategic business thinking, utilizing market research, creativity, and problem-solving.

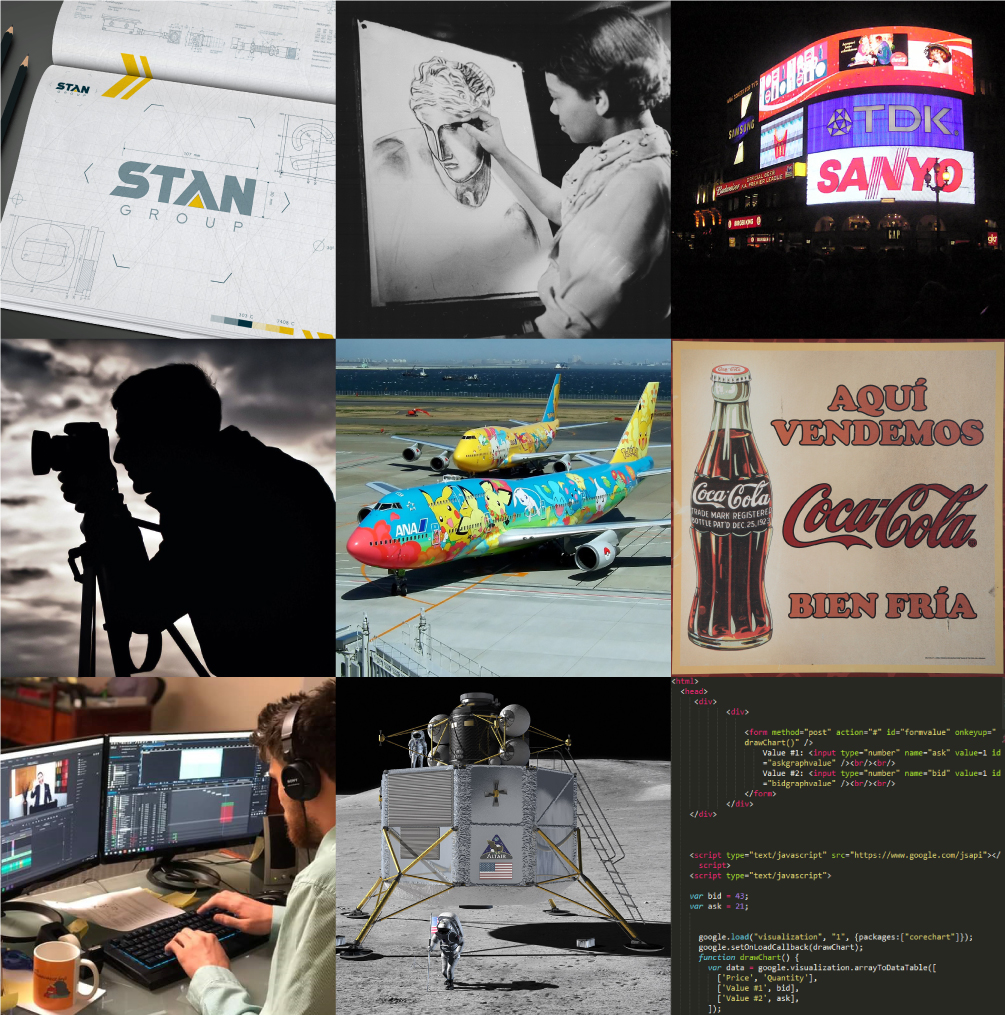
This image shows the different aspects of graphic design.

=== Graphic design ===
The term graphic design can refer to a number of artistic and professional disciplines which focus on visual communication and presentation. Various methods are used to create and combine symbols, images and/or words to create a visual representation of ideas and messages. A graphic designer may use typography, visual arts and page layout techniques to produce the final result. Graphic design often refers to both the process (designing) by which the communication is created and the products (designs) which are generated.

Common uses of graphic design include magazines, advertisements, product packaging and web design. For example, a product package might include a logo or other artwork, organized text and pure design elements such as shapes and color which unify the piece. Composition is one of the most important features of graphic design especially when using pre-existing materials or diverse elements.

=== Graphical representation ===
The term representation, according to O'Shaughnessy and Stadler (2005), can carry a range of meanings and interpretations. In literary theory representation is commonly defined in 3 ways.

1. To look like or resemble
2. To stand in for something or someone
3. To present a second time to re-present

Representation, according to Mitchell (1995), began with early literary theory in the ideas of Plato and Aristotle, and has evolved into a significant component of language, Saussurian and communication studies. Aristotle discusses representation in 3 ways:

1. The object: The symbol being represented.
2. Manner: The way the symbol is represented.
3. Means: The material that is used to represent it.

The means of literary representation is language. The means of graphical representation are graphics. Graphical representation of data is one of the most commonly used modes of presentation. The purpose of graphical communication is to transfer a message or information to the receiver effectively. When professional organizations prepare reports, they usually use graphical presentations.

==== UI/UX ====
The term UI/UX, also known as User Interface/User Experience, refers to how a user interacts and experiences a product. Although these two terms are grouped together, they are two separate functions that are necessary in product design and communication. User Interface is how people interact with a product. The goal is to make products efficient and while maximizing effectiveness. User Experience is how users experience a product and the functionality of the design.

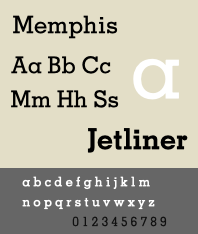
Image of a poster using different typefaces to demonstrate typography

==== Typography ====
Typography is the art of arranging and structuring text for a visually appealing way of communication or identification. It involves font design that creates typefaces made of characters and symbols that communicate different things. Graphic communication uses typography to facilitate ways of understanding information or translating a message that can be conveyed in different ways.

==== Color ====
This image represents the use of contrasting colors in product design

Color is very important in graphic communication. It is a way of conveying information by using color to attract attention and become memorable to the user. Color is one of the first noticeable things about a product and can be noticeable or recognizable whether alone or together. Effective color use is important in visual communication as it can be a determining factor in a products successfulness.

== See also ==
Related subjects

- Graphicacy
- Technical

Related experts

- Stuart Bailey
- Rosemary Sassoon
- Michael Twyman
- Gerard Unger

Related organizations

- American Institute of Graphic Arts
- High School of Graphic Communication Arts
