= Five circles theorem =

Derives a pentagram from five chained circles centered on a common sixth circle

In geometry, the five circles theorem states that, given five circles centered on a common sixth circle and intersecting each other chainwise on the same circle, the lines joining their second intersection points forms a pentagram whose points lie on the circles themselves.

== See also ==
- Clifford's circle theorems
- Miquel's theorem
- Six circles theorem
- Seven circles theorem
