= List of indefinite sums =

Inverse of a finite difference/the antidifference for various functions

This reference list assumes the reader is comfortable with the advanced mathematical concepts presented in the main article and is not intended for beginners.

Visualization of the property $\Delta C(x)=0$ for a 1-periodic function $C(x)$. Because $\Delta C(x)=C(x+1)-C(x)=0$ (resp. $\nabla C(x)=C(x)-C(x-1)=0$ for the backward difference), $C(x+1)=C(x)$ (resp. $C(x)=C(x-1)$). Thus, 1-periodic functions vanish under the difference operators.

This is a list of indefinite sums (also known as antidifferences) of various functions. An indefinite sum $\sum_x f(x)$ is the inverse of the forward difference operator $\Delta$, defined as $\Delta f(x) = f(x+1)-f(x)$. It satisfies the relation

$$\Delta \sum_x f(x) = f(x).$$

The operator is not unique; adding any 1-periodic function to a solution yields another solution.

To obtain a unique solution (up to an additive constant $C$), the Nørlund principal solution is typically used. This imposes the condition that the solution has the minimal possible exponential type in the imaginary direction. The following formulas represent the principal solutions for the half-plane to the right of the rightmost singularity, unless otherwise stated.

== Antidifferences of rational functions ==
For positive integer exponents, Faulhaber's formula can be used. Note that $x$ in the result of Faulhaber's formula must be replaced with $x-1$ due to the offset, as Faulhaber's formula finds $\nabla^{-1}$ rather than $\Delta^{-1}$.

For negative integer exponents, the indefinite sum is closely related to the polygamma function:

$$\sum _x \frac{1}{x^a} = \frac{(-1)^{a-1}\psi^{(a-1)}(x)}{(a-1)!}+ C,\,a\in\mathbb{N}$$

For fractions not listed in this section, one may use the polygamma function with partial fraction decomposition. More generally,

$$\sum _x x^a = \begin{cases}
\frac{B_{a+1}(x)}{a+1} + C, &\text{if } a\neq-1 \\
\psi(x)+C, &\text{if } a=-1
\end{cases} = \begin{cases}
- \zeta(-a, x) +C, &\text{if } a\neq-1 \\
\psi(x)+C, &\text{if } a=-1
\end{cases}$$

where $B_a(x)$ are the generalized Bernoulli polynomials (see Temme, Eq. 2.20), $\zeta(s,a)$ is the Hurwitz zeta function, and $\psi(z)$ is the digamma function. This is related to the generalized harmonic numbers.

As the generalized harmonic numbers use reciprocal powers, $a$ must be substituted for $-a$, and the most common form uses the inverse of the backward difference offset:

$$\nabla^{-1}x^a={H_x^{(-a)}} = \zeta(-a) - \zeta(-a, x+1).$$

Here, $\zeta(-a)$ is the constant $C$.

The Bernoulli polynomials are also related via a partial derivative with respect to $x$ (Temme, Eq. 2.7 and Eq. 2.20):

$$\frac{\partial}{\partial x} \left( \sum_x x^a \right) = B_a(x) = -a \zeta(1 - a, x).$$

This relationship can be expressed via the inverse backward difference operator as:

$$\frac{\partial}{\partial x} \left( \nabla^{-1} x^a \right)\bigg|_{x=0} = -a \zeta(1-a, x+1)\bigg|_{x=0} = -a\zeta(1-a) = B_a.$$

Further generalization comes from use of the Lerch transcendent:

$$\sum_x \frac{z^{x}}{(x+a)^{s}} = - z^{x} \, \Phi(z, s, x + a ) + C,$$

which generalizes the generalized harmonic numbers as $z\Phi\left(z,s,a+1\right)-z^{x+1}\Phi\left(z,s,x+1+a\right)$ when taking $\nabla^{-1}$.

The sum of Bernoulli polynomials follows directly from their defining properties (Temme, Eqs. 2.6 and 2.7) using summation by parts:

$$\sum _x B_a(x)=(x-1)B_a(x)-\frac{a}{a+1} B_{a+1}(x)+C \,,\,\,a\neq -1$$

== Antidifferences of exponential functions ==
$\sum _x a^x = \frac{a^{x}}{a-1} + C$

== Antidifferences of logarithmic functions ==
$\sum _x \log_b x = \log_b \Gamma (x) + C$

$\sum _x \log_b ax = \log_b (a^{x-1}\Gamma (x)) + C$

== Antidifferences of trigonometric functions ==
$\sum _x \sin ax = -\frac{1}{2} \csc \left(\frac{a}{2}\right) \cos \left(\frac{a}{2}- ax \right) + C \,,\,\,a\ne 2n \pi$

$\sum _x \cos ax = \frac{1}{2} \csc \left(\frac{a}{2}\right) \sin \left(ax - \frac{a}{2}\right) + C \,,\,\,a\ne 2n \pi$

$\sum _x \sin^2 ax = \frac{x}{2} + \frac{1}{4} \csc (a) \sin (a-2ax) + C \, \,,\,\,a\ne n\pi$

$\sum _x \cos^2 ax = \frac{x}{2}-\frac{1}{4} \csc (a) \sin (a-2 a x) + C \,\,,\,\,a\ne n\pi$

The antidifference of the normalized sinc function can be obtained by applying the Abel–Plana formula presented in Candelpergher with the shift $x \mapsto x-1$, the condition $F(0)=0$, and recurrence of $F(x+1)-F(x)=f(x)$. Using the reflection formula for the digamma function, this simplifies to:
$$\begin{aligned}
\sum_x \operatorname{sinc} x &= \operatorname{sinc}(x-1)\left(\frac{1}{2}+(x-1) \right. \\
& \quad \left. \times \left(\ln(2)+\frac{\psi (\frac{x-1}{2})+\psi (\frac{1-x}{2})}{2} \right. \right. \\
& \quad \quad \left. \left. -\frac{\psi (x-1)+\psi (1-x)}{2}\right)\right) + \frac{1}{2} + C
\end{aligned}$$

== Antidifferences of hyperbolic functions ==
$\sum _x \sinh ax = \frac{1}{2} \operatorname{csch} \left(\frac{a}{2}\right) \cosh \left(\frac{a}{2} - a x\right) + C$

$\sum _x \cosh ax = \frac{1}{2} \operatorname{csch} \left(\frac{a}{2}\right) \sinh \left(ax-\frac{a}{2}\right) + C$

== Antidifferences of special functions ==
$\sum _x \psi(x)=(x-1) \psi(x)-x+C$

The indefinite sum (antidifference) of the Gamma function gives the Nørlund principal solution to the difference equation $F(x+1) - F(x) = \Gamma(x)$, and is given by:

$\sum _x \Gamma(x)=(-1)^{x+1}\Gamma(x)\frac{\Gamma(1-x,-1)}e+C$

where $\Gamma(s,x)$ is the incomplete gamma function and $e$ is Euler's number.

This specific closed form is derived directly from the incomplete Gamma function representation of the Kurepa function $K_1(z)$ (defined as $K_1(z) = \sum_{n=0}^{\infty}\Gamma(z-n)$), which satisfies the same functional equation $K_1(z) - K_1(z-1) = \Gamma(z)$. By converting Marichev's Cauchy Principal Value integral via Kummer's hypergeometric function, Malešević proved in Theorem 4.1 that $(-1)^{z}\Gamma(1+z)\Gamma(-z,-1)/e$ is the antidifference operator. Substituting $z \to x-1$ yields the expression above.

$\sum _x (x)_a = \frac{(x)_{a+1}}{a+1}+C$

where $(x)_a$ is the falling factorial.

For the super-exponential $F(x)=\operatorname{sexp}_a(x)$, defined by the recurrence $F(x+1)=a^{F(x)}$,

differentiating gives

$$F'(x+1)=F'(x)F(x+1)\ln a.$$

For the base-$e$ case this derivative relation appears as Eq. (6.3) in.

Consequently,

$$\begin{align}
\Delta \log_a\left(\frac{F'(x)}{(\ln a)^x}\right)
&= \log_a\left(\frac{F'(x+1)}{F'(x)\ln a}\right) \\
&= \log_a(F(x+1)) \\
&= F(x).
\end{align}$$

Hence the antidifference is

$$\sum_x \operatorname{sexp}_a(x)
=
\log_a\left(\frac{\operatorname{sexp}_a'(x)}{(\ln a)^x}\right)
+
C.$$

The formula is not stated explicitly in the cited sources, but follows directly from their defining recurrence and derivative relation.
