= Indefinite sum =

Inverse of a finite difference

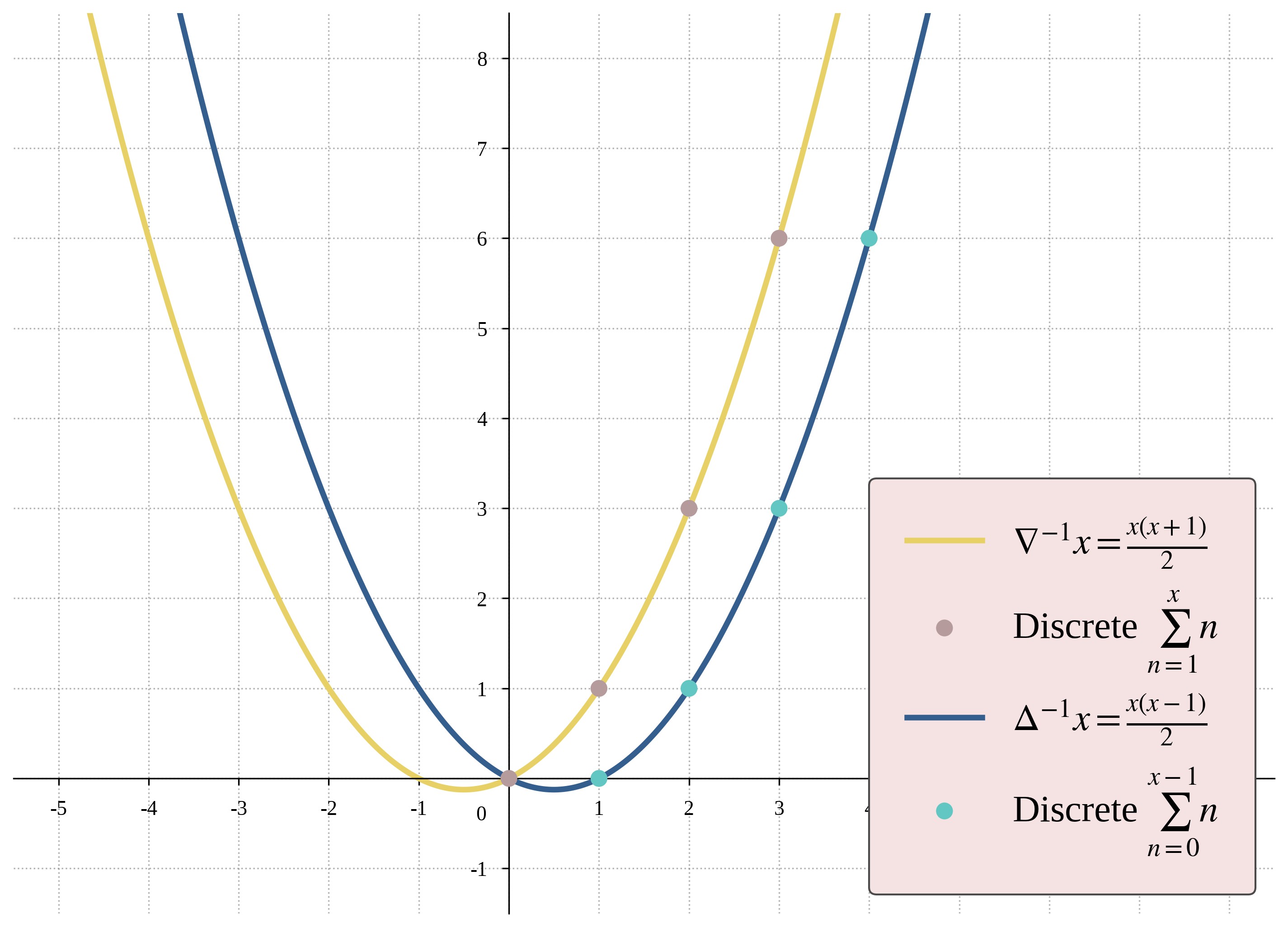
- The inverse forward difference (blue) and inverse backward difference (yellow) of $x$.
- Other names: Antidifference
- Notation: $\Sigma f(x)$, $\sum f(x)$, $\Delta^{-1} f(x)$ (forward), $\nabla^{-1} f(x)$ (backward).
- Definition: Linear operator that inverts the finite difference: $\Delta^{-1}$: $\Delta F(x) = F(x+1)-F(x) = f(x)$ $\nabla^{-1}$: $\nabla F(x) = F(x)-F(x-1) = f(x)$
- Related concepts: Indefinite integral, Bohr–Mollerup theorem, finite difference, summation, Bernoulli polynomials, Gamma function, Euler–Maclaurin formula, Abel–Plana formula

In the calculus of finite differences, the indefinite sum, or antidifference, of a function $f$ is a solution $F$ of the functional equation
$$F(x+1) - F(x) = f(x).$$
For positive integer arguments, the indefinite sum reduces to ordinary summation. The function $F$ is thus the same kind of solution sought in fractional summation, which instead starts from the problem of extending finite sums $\sum_{n=a}^x f(n)$ to non-integer values of the summation bound.

Indefinite sums are generally not unique: if $F$ is an indefinite sum of $f$ then so is $F+C$, where $C(x)$ is a $1$-periodic function.

By choosing one representative from the set of solutions in a way that depends linearly on $f$, one obtains an indefinite summation or antidifference operator, often denoted with the greek letter Sigma $\Sigma$, the summation symbol $\sum$, or $\Delta^{-1}$, which is a right inverse of the forward difference operator $\Delta$:
$$(\Delta(\Sigma f))(x)=f(x).$$
Indefinite summation thus plays for finite differences a role analogous to indefinite integral for the derivative.

== History ==
The notation for indefinite summation goes back to Leonhard Euler, who in his 1755 Institutiones calculi differentialis introduced the symbol $\Sigma$ for the inverse operation to finite differencing $\Delta$. The notation was subsequently used by Joseph-Louis Lagrange in 1772. Indefinite summation is a predecessor of definite summation, introduced by Joseph Fourier in 1820.

== Properties ==
=== Reduction to summation ===
Indefinite sums can be used to calculate definite sums with the formula:

$$\sum_{k=a}^{b-1} f(k)=\Delta^{-1}f(b)-\Delta^{-1}f(a),$$

for integers $a$ and $b$. As a convention, $\Delta^{-1}f(0) = 0$ is often assumed in such a way that $\Delta^{-1}f(x)$ interpolates the partial sums $(\sum_{k=0}^{n-1} f(k))_{n\in\mathbb N}$.

If one wants to interpolate $(\sum_{k=1}^n f(k))_{n\in\mathbb N}$ instead, then one should instead find a solution $\nabla^{-1}f(x)$ of the functional equation $\nabla F(x) = f(x)$, satisfying $\nabla^{-1}f(0) = 0$, where $\nabla$ is the backward difference operator.

=== Summation by parts ===
Indefinite summation by parts is the discrete analog of integration by parts. It is derived from the product rule for the forward difference operator.

Product rule for $\Delta$. For two functions $u(x)$ and $v(x)$, the product rule for the forward difference is:

$$\Delta(u(x)v(x)) = u(x)\Delta v(x) + v(x+1)\Delta u(x).$$

Summation by parts. Rearranging and taking the indefinite sum of both sides yields the formula for summation by parts:
$$\sum u(x)\Delta v(x) = u(x)v(x) - \sum v(x+1)\Delta u(x) + C(x),$$
where $C(x)$ is an arbitrary $1$-periodic function.

=== Symmetry ===
If $f$ is an odd function then $F(z) = F(-1-z),$ which represents a point symmetry about $x = -1/2$. For example, $f(z)=z$ gives $F(z)= z(z+1)/2$.

If $f$ is an even function, then $F(z) = F(-1) - F(-1-z).$

== Examples ==
The following are classical examples of indefinite sums, where $C(x)$ represents an arbitrary 1-periodic function:

- Constant:
  $$\sum c = cx + C(x).$$
- Exponential:
  $$\sum a^x = \frac{a^x - 1}{a-1} + C(x), \quad a \neq 1.$$
- Integer powers:
  $$\sum x^n = \frac{B_{n+1}(x)}{n+1} + C(x).$$
  where $B_n(x)$ is the $n$th Bernoulli polynomial.
- Complex powers $a\neq-1$:
  $$\sum x^a = -\zeta(-a, x) +C(x).$$
  where $\zeta(-a,x)$ is the Hurwitz zeta function.
- Falling factorials:
  $$\sum (x)_n = \frac{(x)_{n+1}}{n+1} + C(x).$$
  This can be further extended to $n\neq-1$ complex using the Gamma function $\Gamma$.
- Reciprocal function:
  $$\sum \frac1x = \psi(x)+C(x)$$
  where $\psi$ is the digamma function. This is related to the generalized harmonic numbers.
- Logarithm:
  $$\sum \log x = \log \Gamma(x) + C(x).$$

== Defining a unique principal solution ==
The functional equation $F(x+1) - F(x) = f(x)$ does not have a unique solution. If $F_1(x)$ is a particular solution, then for any function $C(x)$ satisfying $C(x+1) = C(x)$ (i.e., any 1-periodic function), the function $F_2(x) = F_1(x) + C(x)$ is also a solution. Therefore, the indefinite sum operator defines a family of functions differing by an arbitrary 1-periodic component, $C(x)$.

To select the unique principal solution up to an additive constant $C$ (instead of up to the additive 1-periodic function $C(x)$) one must impose additional constraints.

=== Axiomatic method ===
In their paper How to Add a Noninteger Number of Terms, Müller and Schleicher introduced an axiomatic approach to fractional summation with a real or complex number of terms. Their method extends the classical discrete sum

$$\sum_{k=1}^x f(k)$$

to non-integer and complex upper limits $x$. The definition is built upon six natural axioms:

1. Continued Summation: $\sum_{\nu = x}^{y}f(\nu) + \sum_{\nu = y + 1}^{z}f(\nu) = \sum_{\nu = x}^{z}f(\nu)$.
2. Translation Invariance: $\sum_{\nu = x + s}^{y + s}f(\nu) = \sum_{\nu = x}^{y}f(\nu + s)$.
3. Linearity: $\sum_{\nu = x}^{y}(\lambda f(\nu) + \mu g(\nu)) = \lambda \sum_{\nu = x}^{y}f(\nu) + \mu \sum_{\nu = x}^{y}g(\nu)$.
4. Empty Sum Condition: $\sum_{\nu = 1}^{1}f(\nu) = f(1)$ (equivalent to the empty sum condition).
5. Holomorphy for Monomials: for each $d \in \mathbb{N}$, $z \mapsto \sum_{\nu = 1}^{z} \nu^{d}$ is holomorphic in $\mathbb{C}$.
6. Right-Shift Continuity: if $f(z+n) \to 0$ pointwise as $n \to +\infty$, then $\sum_{\nu = x}^{y} f(\nu+n) \to 0$; more generally, if $f(z+n)$ can be approximated by polynomials $p_n(z+n)$ of fixed degree with $|f(z+n) - p_n(z+n)| \to 0$, then:

$$\left| \sum_{\nu = x}^{y} f(\nu+n) - \sum_{\nu = x}^{y} p_n(\nu+n) \right| \to 0$$.

Axioms S1–S4 force the sum to align with the ordinary finite sum when the limits are integers. Axiom S5 forces monomials to behave the same way under the generalization of fractional sums. Axiom S6 is the crucial axiom that allows one to "step back" the asymptotic region to determine the fractional sum in a finite interval. The exact conditions for the method to work are, as stated in the Definition 1.2 of the paper:

Let $U \subset \mathbb{C}$ and $\sigma \in \mathbb{N} \cup \{-\infty\}$. A function $f:U \rightarrow \mathbb{C}$ will be called fractional summable of degree $\sigma$ if the following conditions are satisfied:

- $x+1 \in U$ for all $x \in U;$
- there exists a sequence of polynomials $(p_n)_{n \in \mathbb{N}}$ of fixed degree $\sigma$ such that for all $x \in U$

$|f(n+x)-p_n(n+x)| \rightarrow 0$ as $n \rightarrow +\infty$

- for every $x,y+1 \in U,$ the limit

$$\lim_{n\to\infty} \left( \sum_{\nu=n+x}^{n+y} p_n(\nu) + \sum_{\nu=1}^{n} \bigl( f(\nu+x-1)-f(\nu+y) \bigr) \right),$$

exists.

In the simplest case when $f(t) \to 0$ as $t \to \infty$ (i.e., the approximating polynomials are zero), this reduces to:

$$\nabla^{-1} f(x) = \sum_{k=1}^{x} f(k) = \sum_{n=1}^{\infty} \bigl( f(n) - f(n+x) \bigr) + C$$

=== Complex analytic method ===
Following the theory developed by Niels Erik Nørlund, the indefinite sum can be uniquely determined for analytic functions by imposing restrictions on their growth in the complex plane. Specifically, by imposing minimal growth, the non-constant periodic terms can be filtered out. He states, "Unter allen regulären Lösungen sind also die Hauptlösungen die von kleinstem Wachstum in bezug auf $x$" (Among all regular solutions, the principal solutions are therefore those of smallest growth with respect to $x$).

The usual formulation assumes that the summand $f(z)$ is analytic in a vertical strip containing a portion of the real line. However, when $f(z)$ has singularities (including those extending into the imaginary direction), a single vertical strip cannot contain the entire real axis. Instead, these singularities create vertical boundaries that split the domain into disjoint maximal vertical strips. For example, poles at $\pm i$ prevent a single strip from crossing the imaginary axis, splitting the domain at $\Re(z) = 0$ into disjoint half-planes.

Nørlund’s theory provides a principal solution in each maximal vertical strip that contains a segment of the real line. While these infinite vertical strips can be shifted horizontally to evaluate the function, they cannot cross the singularities without the recurrence relation causing the singularities to repeat (e.g. digamma). Thus, each maximal vertical strip's principal solution contains no singularities in its respective maximal vertical strip, but contains singularities that recur outwards into outer disjoint maximal vertical strips.

The solution that contains the largest defined portion of the discrete sum being extended is typically designated as the "canonical" principal solution (treated as if it is the only principal solution). The choice of this strip and thus which principal solution is used is not uniquely dictated by the theory; rather, it is a matter of convention that varies between applications.

Two common practices exist. One approach selects the maximal vertical strip that contains the origin (or the strip immediately to its right if the origin lies on a singularity), as this often preserves symmetry or aligns with the natural boundary condition $F(0)=0$. Alternatively, authors may designate the strip situated immediately to the right of the rightmost singularity on the complex plane as the canonical strip, which allows the recurrence to propagate directly from the partial sums over positive integers to the right of said singularity.

Pole placement

For a given maximal vertical strip $(a,b)$, the singularities of the principal solution $F$ outside the strip are determined by the singularities of $f$ and the direction of the recursion. Let $S$ denote the step size, and let $\beta$ be a singular point of $f$. The placement of the poles of $F$ is governed by the following rules.

For the inverse backward difference $F(z) - F(z-S) = f(z)$, Nørlund's analysis shows that the periodic function $\mathfrak{R}(x|\omega)$ is subtracted from the bare solution to obtain the principal solution. This subtraction regularizes the $m=0$ term on the left boundary while retaining it on the right boundary.

Domain	Poles of $F$
$\Re(\beta) \leq a$ (left boundary)	$\beta - mS$, $m = 1, 2, 3, \ldots$
$\Re(\beta) \geq b$ (right boundary)	$\beta + mS$, $m = 0, 1, 2, \ldots$

For the inverse forward difference $F(z+S) - F(z) = f(z)$, Nørlund's analysis shows that the periodic function $\Pi(x|\omega)$ is subtracted from the bare solution. This subtraction regularizes the $m=0$ term on the right boundary while retaining it on the left boundary.

Domain	Poles of $F$
$\Re(\beta) \leq a$ (left boundary)	$\beta - mS$, $m = 0, 1, 2, \ldots$
$\Re(\beta) \geq b$ (right boundary)	$\beta + mS$, $m = 1, 2, 3, \ldots$

The asymmetry arises because the recursion for the backward difference steps left, "landing" on the right boundary and retaining the $m=0$ pole there, while the forward difference steps right, "landing" on the left boundary and retaining the $m=0$ pole there. In both cases, the interior of the strip is completely clean (no poles), all singularities of $f$ outside the strip are shifted outward by integer multiples of $S$ in the appropriate direction, and the solution picks up all singularities outside the strip, not just those on the immediate boundaries.

Proof sketch for the simplest case (exponential type < 2π)

Suppose $f(z)$ is analytic in a vertical strip containing a segment of the real axis, and let $F(z)$ be an analytic solution of $F(z+1)-F(z)=f(z)$ in that strip. To ensure uniqueness within that strip, require $F(z)$ to be of minimal growth, specifically to be of exponential type less than $2\pi$ in the imaginary direction. That is, there exist constants $M>0$ and $\epsilon>0$ such that $|F(z)| \leq M e^{(2\pi-\epsilon)|\Im(z)|}$ as $|\Im(z)| \to \infty$.

Let $F_1(z)$ and $F_2(z)$ be two analytic solutions satisfying this growth condition on the same maximal vertical strip. Their difference $C(z)=F_1(z)-F_2(z)$ is then analytic, 1-periodic (i.e., $C(z+1)=C(z)$), and inherits the same exponential type less than $2\pi$.

Nørlund uses a fundamental result in complex analysis (related to Carlson's theorem, the Phragmén–Lindelöf principle, and the Paley–Wiener theorem) which states that a non-constant periodic entire function must have exponential type at least $2\pi$. This follows from its Fourier series expansion: if $C(z)$ is non-constant, its Fourier series contains a term $a_n e^{2\pi i n z}$ with $n\neq 0$, which has type $2\pi|n| \geq 2\pi$ (though he handles the general case using the Phragmén–Lindelöf principle, not this simplified case where exponential type $<2\pi$). Since $C(z)$ has type strictly less than $2\pi$, it cannot contain any such term and therefore must be constant. Hence, on any fixed maximal vertical strip where the growth condition holds, the solution is unique up to a constant.

The condition of exponential type less than $2\pi$ in the imaginary direction on $f$ is sufficient but not strictly necessary. Nørlund's general definition of the principal solution is the analytic solution $F$ having Fourier components of the minimal possible exponential type for the given $f$ ($F$ of slowest possible growth in the complex plane). If $f$ has exponential type $k$ in imaginary direction, then the principal solution $F(z)$ will also have type $k$ in that strip, provided it converges. For example, $f(z)=\sin(7z)$ has exponential type $7$; its principal solution exists and has type $7$, even though $7>2\pi$.

When $f$ has exponential type exactly $2\pi n$ for some non-zero integer $n$ in every strip where it is analytic (e.g. $f(z)=\sin(2\pi n z)$ has type $2\pi n$; its antidifference contains $\sin(\pi n)=0$ in the denominator) the principal solution fails to exist (is undefined everywhere or fails to be unique up to a constant) because it resonates with the kernel of the difference operator:
$$\Delta^{-1} = \frac{1}{e^{D}-1}.$$
In all other cases–when $f$ is meromorphic and on some vertical strip that contains a segment of the real line, and its exponential type on said strip is not a nonzero integer multiple of $2\pi$–the principal solution exists and is uniquely determined, up to a constant $C$, on that maximal vertical strip.

For functions with isolated poles, distinct strips must give different families of solutions: the native strip provides a pole-free principal solution, and the recurrence propagates the original poles by the step length of every neighboring strip. Thus, the principal solution for a given strip is not the principal solution for an adjacent strip, even if it can be analytically continued across the boundary. The pole placement rules determine the unique minimal-type solution for each open interval. When branch points or logarithms are involved, the boundaries can be more subtle, and the number of unique principal solutions may relate to the distinct sheets of the resulting Riemann surface, rather than simply the count of isolated poles.

For functions with branch-point singularities (e.g. logarithms, positive fractional powers), the vertical strips do not impose a hard boundary on the solution. The indefinite sum may merge into a single-valued solution on a Riemann surface, where the potentially disjoint strips are actually connected by branch cuts. In such cases, the same principal solution can be valid on multiple sheets of the surface, and the number of independent principal solutions is equal to the number of distinct sheets (or branches) of the Riemann surface.

Example: Partitioning disjoint maximal vertical strips ($\nabla^{-1} 1/(x^2+1)$)

Consider the meromorphic function $f(x) = 1/(x^2+1)$. Its poles at $x = \pm i$ split the complex plane into two maximal vertical strips that each contain a segment of the real line: the right half-plane $\Re(x) > 0$ and the left half-plane $\Re(x) < 0$. We construct the Nørlund principal solution of the backward difference equation $F(x)-F(x-1) = f(x)$ with empty-sum normalization $F(0)=0$ on each strip.

Right half-plane ($\Re(x) > 0$). Partial fractions give

$$\frac{1}{x^2+1} = \frac{1}{2i}\!\left(\frac{1}{x-i} - \frac{1}{x+i}\right).$$

The digamma function satisfies $\psi(z+1)-\psi(z) = 1/z$ for all $z \notin \{0,-1,-2,\dots\}$. For $\Re(x) > 0$ the arguments $x+1\pm i$ and $1\pm i$ never hit a non-positive integer, so the identity is valid at every term of the sum:

$$\sum_{k=1}^x \frac{1}{k^2+1}
= \frac{1}{2i}\Bigl[\bigl(\psi(x+1-i)-\psi(1-i)\bigr) - \bigl(\psi(x+1+i)-\psi(1+i)\bigr)\Bigr].$$

Because $\psi(\overline{z}) = \overline{\psi(z)}$, the two terms are complex conjugates, and the expression simplifies to a real function:

$$F_{\text{right}}(x) = \operatorname{Im}\psi(1+i) - \operatorname{Im}\psi(x+1+i), \qquad \Re(x) > 0.$$

The non-simplified function is analytic on the whole right half-plane, and $F_{\text{right}}(0)=0$. Within this strip the difference equation $F(x)-F(x-1)=1/(x^2+1)$ holds for every $x$ in the respective maximal vertical strip (half-plane). If one attempts to continue $F_{\text{right}}$ across the imaginary axis by the recurrence $F(x+1)=F(x)+f(x+1)$, poles appear at $x = \pm i-1, \pm i-2, \dots$-integer (or more generally, span size) shifts of the original singularities that lie in the left half-plane.

Left half-plane ($\Re(x) < 0$). Using the reflection $x\mapsto -x$, the analogous solution on the left half-plane is

$$F_{\text{left}}(x) = \operatorname{Im}\psi(-x+i) - \operatorname{Im}\psi(i), \qquad \Re(x) < 0.$$

For $\Re(x) < 0$ the argument $-x+i$ has a positive real part, so it never equals $0,-1,-2,\dots$; the digamma identity applies and the difference equation is satisfied for all $x$ in the strip. Again the non-simplified function is analytic on the whole left half-plane. Extending this solution to the right via the recurrence would introduce poles at $x = \pm i, \pm i+1, \pm i+2, \dots$, which lie in the right half-plane outside the original strip.

Summary:

Domain	Principal solution (inverse backward difference, $F(0)=0$)
$\Re(x) > 0$	$\operatorname{Im}\psi(1+i) - \operatorname{Im}\psi(x+1+i)$
$\Re(x) < 0$	$\operatorname{Im}\psi(-x+i) - \operatorname{Im}\psi(i)$

The two expressions are analytic on their respective strips and give distinct principal solutions. The poles of the digamma function, which would violate the identity $\psi(z+1)-\psi(z)=1/z$, are never reached inside the respective domains. However, the recurrence propagates the original singularities of $f$ by integer steps, so any attempt to analytically continue one branch into the other strip introduces poles.

=== Convex analytic method ===
In real analysis, the uniqueness condition can be given using higher‑order convexity, generalizing the Bohr-Mollerup theorem. For an integer $p\ge 0$, a function is called $p$-convex if its divided differences of order $p+1$ (i.e., divided differences computed from $p+2$ distinct points) are non‑negative, and $p$-concave if those divided differences are non-positive. A function is called eventually $p$-convex (resp. eventually $p$-concave) if there exists $M>0$ such that it is $p$-convex (resp. $p$-concave) on the interval $(M,\infty)$.

Marichal and Zenaïdi proved the following uniqueness theorem, their method requiring the solution to be eventually $p$-convex or $p$-concave.

Theorem. Let $p\ge 0$ be an integer and let $g:\mathbb{R}_+\to\mathbb{R}$ satisfy $\lim_{n\to\infty}\Delta^p g(n)=0$. If $f:\mathbb{R}_+\to\mathbb{R}$ is an eventually $p$-convex or eventually $p$-concave solution of $\Delta f = g$, then $f$ is uniquely determined up to an additive constant. Moreover, for any $x>0$,

$f(x) = f(1) + \lim_{n\to\infty}\left( \sum_{k=1}^{n-1} g(k) - \sum_{k=0}^{n-1} g(x+k) + \sum_{j=1}^p \binom{x}{j} \Delta^{\,j-1} g(n) \right),$

and the convergence is uniform on bounded subsets of $\mathbb{R}_+$.

== Choice of the constant term ==
Because the indefinite sum is defined only up to an arbitrary 1-periodic function, the constant $C$ must be fixed by an additional condition. Three common choices are the empty sum condition, an integral mean condition that identifies the result with the classical Bernoulli polynomials, and Ramanujan summation.

=== Empty sum boundary condition ===
The most direct method forces the indefinite sum to extend the usual discrete sum and to satisfy the empty sum convention. Alternatively, $\lim_{x\to 0^-}F(x)=0\ \text{or}\ \lim_{x\to 0^+}F(x)=0.$

$\Delta^{-1}f(x)$ corresponds to $\textstyle\sum_{k=0}^{x-1}f(k)$. The convention $\left. \Delta^{-1} f(x) \right|_{x=0} = 0$ makes the sum over an empty interval zero.

These conditions determine the solution uniquely up to an additive constant. For example,

$$\nabla^{-1}x^a={H_x^{(-a)}} = \zeta(-a) - \zeta(-a, x+1).$$

Here, $\zeta(-a)$ is the constant $C$ such that $F(0)=0$.

=== Integral mean condition ===
In the study of Faulhaber's formula and the Euler–Maclaurin formula, it is convenient to identify the indefinite sum of a monomial with the corresponding Bernoulli polynomial. Following Nørlund's construction, the Bernoulli polynomials are obtained as the unique polynomial solution to the discrete difference equation $\Delta B_\nu(x) = \nu x^{\nu-1}$, subject to the initial condition $B_\nu(0) = B_\nu$. From this definition one derives the analytic differentiation rule $\frac{d}{dx}B_\nu(x) = \nu B_{\nu-1}(x)$, which directly yields the integration formula $\int_x^{x+1} B_\nu(z)\,dz = x^\nu$ and, consequently, the normalization condition $\int_0^1 B_n(x)\,dx = 0$. The standard generating function

$$\frac{t e^{x t}}{e^t - 1} = \sum_{n=0}^\infty B_n(x) \frac{t^n}{n!}$$

is then derived as a formal consequence of these prior results (specifically, by applying the formal operator identity $\Delta^{-1}=(e^{D}-1)^{-1}$ to the Maclaurin series expansion of $e^{xt}$ and summing term-wise via linearity), rather than serving as the defining property.

To match this convention, the constant is fixed by requiring that the solution have zero mean over a unit interval. For the inverse backward difference one may use

$$\int_{-1}^{0} \bigl(\nabla^{-1}f(x)+C\bigr)\,dx = 0 \quad\text{or}\quad \int_{0}^{1} \bigl(\nabla^{-1}f(x)+C\bigr)\,dx = 0,$$

and for the inverse forward difference

$$\int_{0}^{1} \bigl(\Delta^{-1}f(x)+C\bigr)\,dx = 0 \quad\text{or}\quad \int_{1}^{2} \bigl(\Delta^{-1}f(x)+C\bigr)\,dx = 0.$$

Example. For $\Delta^{-1}x = \frac{x(x-1)}{2}+C$, the condition $\int_0^1 (\Delta^{-1}x)\,dx = 0$ gives $C = \tfrac{1}{12}$. Hence $\Delta^{-1}x = \frac{x(x-1)}{2}+\frac{1}{12} = \tfrac12 B_2(x)$ with $B_2(x)=x^2-x+\tfrac16$, consistent with the Bernoulli normalization.

This normalization is not mandatory; in modern treatments the empty sum condition is usually preferred. This is usually used in the context of Bernoulli polynomials, the Hurwitz or Riemann zeta functions, the generalized harmonic number function, or other cases dealing with monomials and their antidifferences.

== Relationship to indefinite products ==
In the symbolic method developed by Niels Erik Nørlund and L. M. Milne-Thomson, the indefinite product operator $\prod$ serves as the multiplicative analog to the indefinite sum. It is defined by the first order homogeneous equation $F(x + 1) = f(x)F(x).$

By taking the logarithm of the product formula, one obtains the telescoping identity $\Delta \log F(x) = \log f(x)$. This allows the indefinite product to be expressed through an indefinite sum:

$$\prod f(x) = \varpi(x) \exp \left( \sum \log f(x) \right),$$

where $\varpi(x)$ is an arbitrary periodic function of period 1 assuming the disjoint maximal vertical strips and branch cuts of the natural logarithm are handled appropriately. This representation is valid provided a branch of the logarithm can be chosen so that $\log\left(f\left(x\right)\right)$ is single-valued and its indefinite sum exists. Conversely, an indefinite sum may be represented as the logarithm of an indefinite product:

$$\sum f(x) = \log \left( \prod \exp(f(x)) \right) + C(x).$$

=== Gamma function and Gauss Pi function ===
For $f(x)=x$, the forward difference indefinite product $\prod x$ is the solution of $F(x+1)=x\,F(x)$ with the empty product normalization $F(1)=1$ alongside Nørlund's minimal growth. This yields the Gamma function $\prod x = \Gamma(x),$ which represents the discrete product $\prod_{k=1}^{x-1} k.$

It can also be obtained by taking the Nørlund principal solution to the inverse forward difference: $\sum \log x = \log \Gamma(x) + C(x)$. Exponentiating and choosing the empty product condition to set the constant then yields the Gamma function.

If one instead works with the backward difference indefinite product, satisfying $F(x)=x\,F(x-1)$ and $F(0)=1$, the solution is the Gauss Pi function, $\Pi(x)$, which extends $x!$ directly and represents the discrete product $\prod_{k=1}^{x} k$.

The two conventions differ only by a shift of the argument (a property inherited from the relationship between $\nabla^{-1}$ and $\Delta^{-1}$): $\Pi(x)=\Gamma(x+1)$. The minimal imaginary growth condition in each case forces $\varpi(x)$ to be a constant $1$, so the principal indefinite product of $x$ recovers the classical factorial extensions.

== Expansions and definitions ==
=== Abel–Plana formula ===
The indefinite sum $\nabla^{-1}f(x) = \sum_{k=1}^x f(k)$ can be analytically continued by applying the standard Abel-Plana formula to the finite sum $\sum_{k=1}^n f(k)$ and then analytically continuing the integer limit $n$ to the variable $x$. This yields the formula:
$$\begin{aligned}
\nabla^{-1}f(x) &= \int_{1}^{x}f(t)dt+\frac{f(1)+f(x)}{2} \\
& \quad + i\int_{0}^{\infty}\frac{\left(f(x-it)-f(1-it)\right)-\left(f(x+it)-f(1+it)\right)}{e^{2\pi t}-1}dt + C(x)
\end{aligned}$$
This analytic continuation is valid when the conditions for the original formula are met. The sufficient conditions are:

1. Analyticity: $f(z)$ must be analytic in the closed vertical strip between $\Re(z)=1$ and $\Re(z)=\Re(x)$. The formula provides the analytic solution up to, but not beyond, the nearest singularities of $f$ to the line $\Re(z)=1.$
2. Growth: $f(z)$ must be of exponential type less than $2\pi$ in this strip, satisfying $|f(z)| \leq Me^{(2\pi-\epsilon)|\Im(z)|}$ for some $M>0$, $\epsilon>0$ as $|\Im(z)| \to \infty.$

Example: Step size generalization by routine change of variables

Let $S>0$ be a real step size and suppose $f(z)$ satisfies the standard Abel–Plana conditions on the appropriate strips. Apply the Abel–Plana formula to the function $g(t)=f(St)$ with upper limit $n = x/S + 1$:
$$\begin{aligned}
\sum_{k=1}^{x/S+1} f(Sk)
&= \int_{1}^{x/S+1} f(St)\,dt + \frac{f(S)+f(x+S)}{2} \\
&\quad + i\int_{0}^{\infty}\frac{f(x+S-iSt)-f(S-iSt)-f(x+S+iSt)+f(S+iSt)}{e^{2\pi t}-1}\,dt.
\end{aligned}$$
Now subtract the last term $f(x+S)$ from both sides, because $\sum_{k=1}^{x/S+1} f(Sk) = \sum_{k=1}^{x/S} f(Sk) + f(x+S)$:
$$\begin{aligned}
\sum_{k=1}^{x/S} f(Sk)
&= \int_{1}^{x/S+1} f(St)\,dt + \frac{f(S)+f(x+S)}{2} - f(x+S) \\
&\quad + i\int_{0}^{\infty}\frac{f(x+S-iSt)-f(S-iSt)-f(x+S+iSt)+f(S+iSt)}{e^{2\pi t}-1}\,dt.
\end{aligned}$$
Simplify the boundary terms: $\tfrac{f(S)+f(x+S)}{2} - f(x+S) = \tfrac{f(S)-f(x+S)}{2}.$ In the real integral, substitute $u = St$, $dt = du/S$, limits $t=1\to u=S$, $t=x/S+1 \to u=x+S$:
$$\int_{1}^{x/S+1} f(St)\,dt = \frac{1}{S}\int_{S}^{x+S} f(u)\,du.$$
The imaginary part is already in a convenient form; by reordering the terms it becomes:
$$i\int_{0}^{\infty}\frac{\bigl(f(S+iSt)-f(S-iSt)\bigr)-\bigl(f(x+S+iSt)-f(x+S-iSt)\bigr)}{e^{2\pi t}-1}\,dt.$$
Thus we obtain the step size generalization:
$$\begin{aligned}
\nabla^{-1}_{S} f(x)
&= \frac{1}{S}\int_{S}^{x+S} f(u)\,du + \frac{f(S)-f(x+S)}{2} \\
&\quad + i\int_{0}^{\infty}\frac{\bigl(f(S+iSt)-f(S-iSt)\bigr)-\bigl(f(x+S+iSt)-f(x+S-iSt)\bigr)}{e^{2\pi t}-1}\,dt \\
&\quad + C(x),
\end{aligned}$$
where $C(x)$ is a $S$-periodic function. The expression satisfies $F(x)-F(x-S)=f(x)$ and, with the empty sum convention $F(0)=0$ (or up to another constant convention; $C(x)$ being a constant function), defines the Nørlund principal solution where the growth condition on $f$ becomes type $<2\pi/S$ after the scaling.

The Abel–Plana formula can be used to obtain the Nørlund principal solution on arbitrary disjoint maximal vertical strips through the recurrence $F(z)-F(z-1)=f(z)$ allowing one to shift the Abel–Plana formula's domain of convergence, then repeatedly extend out of the original domain of convergence using the known valid domain of $F$ (which is known on the starting maximal vertical strip) and $f$ (which is entirely known), again justified through rearrangement of the equation $F(z)-F(z-1)=f(z)$. This is under the condition that a step size length (along the real axis) maximal vertical strip (extending infinitely in the imaginary directions) can be obtained while being singularity free and of less than $2\pi/S$ (where $S$ is the step size) exponential type in the imaginary direction on $f$. If such a strip cannot be established one must fall back to Laurent series or Taylor series expansions and sum term-wise. The exponential type can be reduced through summation by parts rules and the linearity of the operator to make $f$ possible to take the antidifference numerically using Abel–Plana and term-wise expansions, unless the $f$ globally resonates in every possible strip.

=== Newton series ===
For an entire function of exponential type less than $\log\left(2\right)$ the inverse forward difference operator, $\Delta^{-1}f(x)$, can be expressed by its Newton series expansion:

$$\sum f(x)=\sum_{k=1}^\infty \binom{x}k \Delta^{k-1} f\left (0\right)+C(x)=\sum_{k=1}^{\infty}\frac{\Delta^{k-1}f(0)}{k!}(x)_k+C(x).$$

$(x)_k=\frac{\Gamma(x+1)}{\Gamma(x-k+1)}$ is the falling factorial.

=== Bernoulli‑operator series expansion ===
Formally, the inverse forward difference operator can be expressed in terms of the derivative operator $D = \frac{d}{dx}$ using the exponential generating function of the Bernoulli numbers:
$$\Delta^{-1} = \frac{1}{e^{D}-1} = \sum_{v=0}^{\infty} \frac{B_v}{v!} D^{\,v-1},$$
where $B_v$ are the Bernoulli numbers defined by the generating function $\frac{t}{e^{t}-1} = \sum_{v=0}^\infty B_v \frac{t^v}{v!}$. Under this convention $B_1 = -\tfrac12$.

If $f$ is a polynomial, only finitely many terms of the series are non-zero as the finite difference of a monomial is a polynomial of one degree lower (following by induction, finitely many terms are required). For $f(x)=x^n$ one obtains the antidifference:
$$\sum x^n = \frac{B_{n+1}(x)}{n+1} + C(x),$$
where $B_n(x)$ are the Bernoulli polynomials of the first order.

If $f$ admits a Maclaurin series expansion $f(x)=\sum_{n=0}^{\infty} \frac{f^{(n)}(0)}{n!} x^n$, the antidifference of monomials in the series expansion yields the formal series:
$$\sum f(x)= \sum_{n=1}^{\infty} \frac{f^{(n-1)}(0)}{n!} B_n(x) + C(x).$$
For non‑polynomials this expansion is generally asymptotic.

Relation to the inverse backward difference

If one instead expands the inverse backward difference operator, $\nabla^{-1} = \frac{e^{D}}{e^{D}-1}$ (which extends $\sum_{k=1}^x f(k)$), it admits the same expansion, but with $B_1 = +\tfrac12$ in place of $B_1 = -\tfrac12$.

=== Euler–Maclaurin formula ===
The Euler–Maclaurin formula provides an asymptotic expansion for the inverse backward difference $\nabla^{-1}f(x) = \sum_{k=1}^x f(k)$ when the function is sufficiently smooth. For any positive integer $m$, one has:
$$\begin{aligned}
\nabla^{-1}f(x) &= \int_{1}^{x} f(t)\,dt + \frac{f(1)+f(x)}{2} \\
&\quad + \sum_{k=2}^{m} \frac{(-1)^k B_k}{k!} \bigl( f^{(k-1)}(x) - f^{(k-1)}(1) \bigr) + R_m(x) + C(x),
\end{aligned}$$
where $B_k$ are the Bernoulli numbers ($B_1 = -\tfrac12$, $B_3 = B_5 = \cdots = 0$), and the remainder term is
$$R_m(x) = (-1)^{m+1} \int_{1}^{x} \frac{b_m(t)}{m!} \, f^{(m)}(t)\,dt,$$
with $b_m(t) = B_m(t - \lfloor t \rfloor)$ the periodized Bernoulli polynomial. The terms with odd $k > 1$ vanish, so the sum effectively runs only over even indices. Choosing $m = 2p$ gives the form
$$\begin{aligned}
\nabla^{-1}f(x) &= \int_{1}^{x} f(t)\,dt + \frac{f(1)+f(x)}{2} \\
&\quad + \sum_{k=1}^{p} \frac{B_{2k}}{(2k)!} \bigl( f^{(2k-1)}(x) - f^{(2k-1)}(1) \bigr) + R_{2p}(x) + C(x),
\end{aligned}$$
with the remainder
$$R_{2p}(x) = -\int_{1}^{x} \frac{b_{2p}(t)}{(2p)!} \, f^{(2p)}(t)\,dt.$$
The formula gives the analytic continuation of the discrete sum.

=== Laplace summation (Gregory summation formula) ===
Laplace's summation formula, closely related to the Gregory summation formula, can be seen as the discrete counterpart to the Euler–Maclaurin formula. The inverse forward difference $\Delta^{-1}f(x)$:
$$\sum f(x)=\int_0^x f(t) dt -\sum_{k=1}^\infty \frac{c_k}{k!}\Delta^{k-1}f(x) + C(x)$$
where $c_k=\int_0^1 (x)_k dx$ are the Cauchy numbers of the first kind.

$(x)_k=\frac{\Gamma(x+1)}{\Gamma(x-k+1)}$ is the falling factorial.

Truncating the series after $n$ terms leaves a remainder that can be expressed as an integral of $f^{(n)}$ times a periodic Bernoulli polynomial. In the notation of Charles Jordan, Gregory's formula is:
$$\begin{align}
\sum_{x=a}^z f(x) &= \int_a^z f(x)\,dx \\
&\quad - \sum_{m=1}^n b_m\bigl[\Delta^{m-1}f(z)-\Delta^{m-1}f(a)\bigr] \\
&\quad - b_n\,(z-a)\,\Delta^n f(\xi), \quad a<\xi<z,
\end{align}$$
where the coefficients $b_m$ are the Bernoulli numbers of the second kind. Note the argument is without a shift, aligning with the inverse backward difference.

== Applications ==
The indefinite sum and its principal solution are fundamental to diverse fields, providing an analytic framework for extending discrete problems into the continuous and complex domains. Its applications span the construction of special functions, the regularization of divergent series in quantum field theory (e.g., the Casimir effect), performance analysis in queueing theory, scalar evolution in compilers such as LLVM or the GNU Compiler Collection, and various numerical and symbolic computational methods.

=== Special functions ===
Many standard transcendental functions are naturally defined as indefinite sums of elementary terms. Under the Nørlund principal solution—which imposes minimal exponential growth to eliminate arbitrary periodic components—these definitions coincide with the usual analytic continuations.

- The Gamma function follows from $\sum \log x = \log\Gamma(x) + C(x)$ and exponentiating to get the indefinite product, which, through the inverse backward difference variant gives the Gauss Pi function, $\Pi(x)=\Gamma(x+1)$.
- The digamma and more generally polygamma functions are obtained by the indefinite summation of reciprocal powers. From the recurrence $\psi^{(n)}(z+1) = \psi^{(n)}(z) + (-1)^n n! z^{-n-1}$, one obtains $\sum 1/x^a = (-1)^{a-1}\psi^{(a-1)}(x)/(a-1)! + C$ for $a\in\mathbb{N}$.
- The power formula $\sum x^a = -\,\zeta(-a, x) + C(x)$ yields the Hurwitz zeta function; with the zero-mean convention it reduces to the Bernoulli polynomials $B_{a+1}(x)/(a+1)$.
- The beta function satisfies $\Delta_x B(x,y) = -B(x,y+1)$, meaning that $B(x,y)$ serves as the indefinite sum of $-B(x,y+1)$ with respect to $x$.
- Sums of the form $\sum z^x / (x+a)^s$ are expressed via the Lerch transcendent:
  $$\sum \frac{z^{x}}{(x+a)^{s}} = - z^{x} \, \Phi(z, s, x + a ) + C(x),$$
  which generalizes the generalized harmonic numbers. With the empty-sum convention and translating to $\nabla^{-1}$ (which becomes the extension of $\sum_{n=1}^{x}\frac{z^{n}}{\left(n+a\right)^{s}}$), this becomes $z\Phi\left(z,s,a+1\right)-z^{x+1}\Phi\left(z,s,x+1+a\right).$

=== Quantum field theory and the Casimir effect ===
In the mode-summation approach to the Casimir effect, vacuum expectation values involve divergent sums $\textstyle\sum_{n} f(n)$. The Abel–Plana formula—which provides an exact relation between a discrete sum and an integral—is a primary tool for isolating the divergent contribution. By subtracting the integral representation of the infinite-volume contribution, the formula yields a finite, cutoff-independent remainder for the Casimir energy and other observables. For geometries where the eigenfrequencies are zeros of Bessel functions, the ordinary Abel–Plana formula is insufficient. The generalized Abel–Plana formula extends the indefinite sum to summands with branch-point singularities and has been directly applied to regularise Casimir energies for spherical and cylindrical shells.

=== Queueing theory and probability ===
First-order difference equations of the form $F(x+1)-F(x)=f(x)$ or $F(x)-F(x-1)=f(x)$ arise frequently in the analysis of stochastic queues. The Nørlund principal solution provides an explicit, analytically tractable solution for key performance measures, such as emptiness probabilities, waiting-time distributions, and blocking probabilities, while its minimal-growth condition automatically filters out non-physical, oscillatory 1-periodic components. This framework is used in teletraffic engineering. For instance, the Erlang loss function $B(x, a)$, which gives the blocking probability for $x$ servers, is naturally extended from integral to real trunk counts via the Nørlund sum of its defining recurrence. This analytic continuation enables the computation of continuous derivatives—such as $\partial B(x,a)/\partial x$—which are essential for gradient-based sensitivity analysis and optimization of trunk-group sizing in telecommunications networks, as derivatives are otherwise undefined over discrete server counts. Similarly, in transient queue analysis, the Nørlund framework and its associated Euler-Maclaurin expansions allow the construction of simple, uniformly accurate approximations for time-dependent probabilities, such as the emptiness probability $P(t,0)$ for the $M/M/1$ queue.

=== Numerical analysis and symbolic summation ===
The indefinite sum underpins several foundational computational methods:

- The Euler–Maclaurin formula is an asymptotic expansion of $\nabla^{-1}f(x)$, used to accelerate series convergence and to estimate errors in numerical quadrature.
- Gosper's algorithm and Karr's summation in finite terms find closed-form indefinite sums of hypergeometric terms and are implemented in computer algebra systems.
- The Gregory-Laplace summation formula expresses the indefinite sum in terms of finite differences and is particularly useful for numerical integration over equispaced data, providing an efficient alternative to traditional quadrature when high-order differences decay rapidly.

=== Compiler scalar evolution ===
In compiler optimization, the scalar evolution (SCEV) analysis framework in LLVM and GCC utilizes chains of recurrences to model the values of induction variables inside loops. When a loop variable updates according to a relation of the form $S_{n+1}=S_n+f(n)$, SCEV represents its closed-form expression $\textstyle S_n = S_0 + \sum_{k=0}^{n-1} f(k)$, where the sum is a finite sum over the loop iteration count. These closed forms allow the compiler to replace repeated computations with direct formulas, enabling strength reduction, loop-invariant code motion, and dependence analysis without iterative re-evaluation of the recurrence.

== See also ==
- Indefinite product
- Time scale calculus
- Nachbin's theorem
- Mittag-Leffler summation
- Borel summation
- Faulhaber's formula
- Special functions
- Analytic continuation
- Bernoulli polynomials
- List of indefinite sums
- Nörlund–Rice integral
- Finite difference
- List of derivatives and integrals in alternative calculi
- Quantum calculus

== Bibliography ==
- Abramowitz, Milton; Stegun, Irene A. (2013). Handbook of mathematical functions: with formulas, graphs, and mathematical tables (9. Dover print. ed.). New York, NY: Dover Publ. ISBN 978-0486612720.
- Candelpergher, Bernard (2017). Ramanujan Summation of Divergent Series (PDF). Lecture Notes in Mathematics. Vol. 2185. Springer. ISBN 978-3-319-63629-0.
- Candelpergher, Bernard (2025). "A new expansion of the Riemann zeta function". arXiv:2512.11405 [math.NT].
- GCC Project. "tree-scalar-evolution.h – Scalar evolution analysis".
- Gosper, R. William (January 1978). "Decision procedure for indefinite hypergeometric summation". Proceedings of the National Academy of Sciences of the United States of America. 75 (1): 40–42. Bibcode:1978PNAS...75...40G. doi:10.1073/pnas.75.1.40. PMC 411178. PMID 16592483.
- Jagerman, David L. (2000). Difference Equations with Applications to Queues. New York: CRC Press. ISBN 978-0-8247-0388-2.
- Jordan, Charles (1960). Calculus of Finite Differences (Second ed.). New York, NY: Chelsea Publishing Company.
- Karr, Michael (April 1981). "Summation in Finite Terms". Journal of the ACM. 28 (2): 305–350. doi:10.1145/322248.322255.
- Kelley, Walter G.; Peterson, Allan C. (2001). Difference Equations: An Introduction with Applications. Academic Press. ISBN 0-12-403330-X.
- LLVM Project. "ScalarEvolution.h – The scalar evolution analysis and transformation framework".
- Marichal, Jean-Luc; Zenaïdi, Naïm (2022). A Generalization of Bohr-Mollerup's Theorem for Higher Order Convex Functions. Developments in Mathematics. Vol. 70. Springer. doi:10.1007/978-3-030-95088-0. ISBN 978-3-030-95087-3.
- Marichal, Jean-Luc; Zenaïdi, Naïm (2024). "A generalization of Bohr-Mollerup's theorem for higher order convex functions: a tutorial". Aequationes Mathematicae. 98 (2): 455–481. arXiv:2207.12694. doi:10.1007/s00010-023-00968-9.
- Milne-Thomson, L. M. (1933). The Calculus of Finite Differences. Macmillan and Co.
- Mueller, Markus; Schleicher, Dierk (2011). "How to Add a Noninteger Number of Terms: From Axioms to New Identities". The American Mathematical Monthly. 118 (2): 136. arXiv:1001.4695. doi:10.4169/amer.math.monthly.118.02.136.
- "§2.10 Sums and Sequences". NIST Digital Library of Mathematical Functions. National Institute of Standards and Technology.
- Nörlund, Niels Erik (1924). Vorlesungen über Differenzenrechnung. Springer. doi:10.1007/978-3-642-50824-0. hdl:2027/uc1.b4249339.
- Olver, Frank W. J. (1997). Asymptotics and Special Functions. A K Peters Ltd. ISBN 978-1-56881-069-0.
- Saharian, A. A. (8 August 2007). "The generalized Abel-Plana formula with applications to Bessel functions and Casimir effect". arXiv:0708.1187 [hep-th].
- Steffensen, J. F. (1950). Interpolation (2nd ed.). New York, NY: Chelsea Publishing Company.
