= List of derivatives and integrals in alternative calculi =

There are many alternatives to the classical calculus of Newton and Leibniz; for example, each of the infinitely many non-Newtonian calculi. Occasionally an alternative calculus is more suited than the classical calculus for expressing a given scientific or mathematical idea.

The table below is intended to assist people working with the alternative calculus called the "geometric calculus" (or its discrete analog).

== Table ==
In the following table;

$\psi(x)=\frac{\Gamma'(x)}{\Gamma(x)}$ is the digamma function,

$\operatorname{K}(x)=e^{\zeta^\prime(-1,x)-\zeta^\prime(-1)}=e^{\frac{z-z^2}{2}+\frac z2 \ln (2\pi)-\psi^{(-2)}(z)}$ is the K-function,

$(!x)=\frac{\Gamma(x+1,-1)}{e}$ is subfactorial,

$B_a(x)=-a\zeta(-a+1,x)$ are the generalized to real numbers Bernoulli polynomials.

Function $f(x)$	Derivative $f'(x)$	Integral $\int f(x) dx$ (constant term is omitted)	Multiplicative derivative $f^*(x)$	Multiplicative integral $\int f(x)^{dx}$ (constant factor is omitted)	Discrete derivative (difference) $\Delta f(x)$	Discrete integral (antidifference) $\Delta^{-1} f(x)$ (constant term is omitted)	Discrete multiplicative derivative (multiplicative difference)	Discrete multiplicative integral (indefinite product) $\prod _x f(x)$ (constant factor is omitted)
$a$	$0$	$ax$	$1$	$a^x$	$0$	$ax$	$1$	$a^x$
$x$	$1$	$\frac{x^2}{2}$	$\sqrt[x]{e}$	$\frac{x^x}{e^x}$	$1$	$\frac{x^2}{2}-\frac x2$	$1+\frac 1x$	$\Gamma(x)$
$ax+b$	$a$	$\frac{ax^2+2bx}{2}$	$\exp\left(\frac{a}{ax+b}\right)$	$\frac{(b+a x)^{\frac{b}{a}+x}}{e^x}$	$a$	$\frac{ax^2+2bx-ax}{2}$	$1+\frac{a}{ax+b}$	$\frac{a^x\Gamma(\frac{ax+b}{a})}{\Gamma(\frac{a+b}{a})}$
$\frac 1x$	$-\frac{1}{x^2}$	$\ln |x|$	$\frac{1}{\sqrt[x]{e}}$	$\frac{e^x}{x^x}$	$-\frac{1}{x+x^2}$	$\psi(x)$	$\frac{x}{x+1}$	$\frac{1}{\Gamma(x)}$
$x^a$	$ax^{a-1}$	$\frac{x^{a+1}}{a+1}$	$e^{\frac ax}$	$e^{-a x} x^{ax}$	$(x+1)^a-x^a$	$a\notin \mathbb{Z}^-\,;$$\frac{B_{a+1}(x)}{a+1},$ $a\in\mathbb{Z}^-\,;$$\frac{(-1)^{a-1}\psi^{(-a-1)}(x)}{\Gamma(-a)},$	$\left(1+\frac 1x\right)^a$	$\Gamma(x)^a$
$a^x$	$a^x\ln a$	$\frac{a^x}{\ln a}$	$a$	$a^{\frac{x^2}{2}}$	$(a-1)a^x$	$\frac{a^x}{a-1}$	$a$	$a^{\frac{x^2+x}{2}}$
$\sqrt[x]{a}$	$-\frac{\sqrt[x]{a}\ln a}{x^2}$	$x\sqrt[x]{a}-\operatorname{Ei}\left(\frac{\ln a}{x}\right)\ln a$	$a^{-\frac{1}{x^2}}$	$a^{\ln x}$	$a^{\frac{1}{1+x}}-a^{\frac{1}{x}}$	$?$	$a^{-\frac{1}{x+x^2}}$	$a^{\psi(x)}$
$\log_a x$	$\frac{1}{x \ln a}$	$\log_a x^x-\frac{x}{\ln a}$	$\exp \left(\frac{1}{x\ln x}\right)$	$\frac{(\log_a x)^x}{e^{\operatorname{li}(x)}}$	$\log_a\left(\frac 1x+1\right)$	$\log_a \Gamma(x)$	$\log_x (x+1)$	$?$
$x^x$	$x^x(1+\ln x)$	$?$	$ex$	$e^{-\frac{1}{4}x^2(1-2\ln x)}$	$(x+1)^{x+1}-x^x$	$?$	$\frac{(x+1)^{x+1}}{x^x}$	$\operatorname{K}(x)$
$\Gamma(x)$	$\Gamma(x)\psi(x)$	$?$	$e^{\psi(x)}$	$e^{\psi^{(-2)}(x)}$	$(x-1)\Gamma(x)$	$(-1)^{x+1}\Gamma(x)(!(-x))$	$x$	$\frac{\Gamma(x)^{x-1}}{\operatorname{K}(x)}$
$\sin(ax)$	$a\cos(ax)$	$-\dfrac{\cos(ax)}{a}$	$e^{a\cot(ax)}$	$?$	$\sin(a(x+1))-\sin(ax)$	$-\dfrac{1}{2}\csc\left(\dfrac{a}{2}\right)\cos\left(\dfrac{a}{2}-ax\right)$	$\cos(a)+\sin(a)\cot(ax)$	$?$

== See also ==
- Derivative
- Differentiation rules
- Indefinite product
- Product integral
- Fractal derivative
