= Indefinite product =

Multiplicative analogue of an indefinite sum

In mathematics, the indefinite product operator is the inverse operator of $Q(f(x)) = \frac{f(x+1)}{f(x)}$. It is a discrete version of the geometric integral of geometric calculus.

Thus

$$Q\left( \prod_x f(x) \right) = f(x) \, .$$

More explicitly, if $\prod_x f(x) = F(x)$, then

$$\frac{F(x+1)}{F(x)} = f(x) \, .$$

If F(x) is a solution of this functional equation for a given f(x), then so is CF(x) for any constant C. Therefore, each indefinite product actually represents a family of functions, differing by a multiplicative constant.

== Connection to indefinite sum ==
Indefinite product can be expressed in terms of indefinite sum:

$$\prod _x f(x)= \exp \left(\sum _x \ln f(x)\right)$$

== Alternative usage ==
Some authors use the phrase "indefinite product" in a slightly different but related way to describe a product in which the numerical value of the upper limit is not given. e.g.

$$\prod_{k=1}^n f(k)$$.

== Rules ==
$$\prod _x f(x)g(x) = \prod _x f(x)\prod _x g(x)$$

$$\prod _x f(x)^a = \left(\prod _x f(x)\right)^a$$

$$\prod _x a^{f(x)} = a^{\sum _x f(x)}$$

== List of indefinite products ==
This is a list of indefinite products $\prod _x f(x)$. Not all functions have an indefinite product which can be expressed in elementary functions.

$$\prod _x a = C a^x$$

$$\prod _x x = C\, \Gamma (x)$$

$$\prod _x \frac{x+1}{x} = C x$$

$$\prod _x \frac{x+a}{x} = \frac{C\,\Gamma (x+a)}{\Gamma (x)}$$

$$\prod _x x^a = C\, \Gamma (x)^a$$

$$\prod _x ax = C a^x \Gamma (x)$$

$$\prod _x a^x = C a^{\frac{x}{2} (x-1)}$$

$$\prod _x a^{\frac{1}{x}} = C a^{\frac{\Gamma'(x)}{\Gamma(x)}}$$

$$\prod _x x^x= C\, e^{\zeta^\prime(-1,x)-\zeta^\prime(-1)}= C\,e^{\psi^{(-2)}(z)+\frac{z^2-z}{2}-\frac z2 \ln (2\pi)}= C\, \operatorname{K}(x)$$

(see K-function)

$$\prod _x \Gamma(x) = \frac{C\,\Gamma(x)^{x-1}}{\operatorname{K}(x)} = C\,\Gamma(x)^{x-1} e^{\frac z2 \ln (2\pi)-\frac{z^2-z}{2}-\psi^{(-2)}(z)}= C\, \operatorname{G}(x)$$

(see Barnes G-function)

$$\prod _x \operatorname{sexp}_a(x) =  \frac{C\, (\operatorname{sexp}_a (x))'}{\operatorname{sexp}_a (x)(\ln a)^x}$$

(see super-exponential function)

$$\prod _x x+a = C\,\Gamma (x+a)$$

$$\prod _x ax+b = C\, a^x \Gamma \left(x+\frac{b}{a}\right)$$

$$\prod _x ax^2+bx = C\,a^x \Gamma (x) \Gamma \left(x+\frac{b}{a}\right)$$

$$\prod _x x^2+1 = C\, \Gamma (x-i) \Gamma (x+i)$$

$$\prod _x x+\frac {1}{x} = \frac{C\, \Gamma (x-i) \Gamma (x+i)}{\Gamma (x)}$$

$$\prod _x \csc x \sin (x+1) = C \sin x$$

$$\prod _x \sec x \cos (x+1) = C \cos x$$

$$\prod _x \cot x \tan (x+1) = C \tan x$$

$$\prod _x \tan x \cot (x+1) = C \cot x$$

== See also ==
- Indefinite sum
- Product integral
- List of derivatives and integrals in alternative calculi
- Fractal derivative
- Viète's formula
