= Milne-Thomson circle theorem =

In fluid dynamics the Milne-Thomson circle theorem or the circle theorem is a statement giving a new stream function for a fluid flow when a cylinder is placed into that flow. It was named after the English mathematician L. M. Milne-Thomson.

Let $f(z)$ be the complex potential for a fluid flow, where all singularities of $f(z)$ lie in $|z| > a$. If a circle $|z| = a$ is placed into that flow, the complex potential for the new flow is given by

$$w = f(z) + \overline{f\left( \frac{a^2}{\bar{z}} \right)} = f(z) + \overline f\left( \frac{a^2}{z} \right).$$

with same singularities as $f(z)$ in $|z| > a$ and $|z| = a$ is a streamline. On the circle $|z| = a$, $z\bar z = a^2$, therefore

$$w = f(z) + \overline{f(z)}.$$

== Example ==
Consider a uniform irrotational flow $f(z) = Uz$ with velocity $U$ flowing in the positive $x$ direction and place an infinitely long cylinder of radius $a$ in the flow with the center of the cylinder at the origin. Then $f\left(\frac{a^2}{\bar z}\right) = \frac{Ua^2}{\bar z}, \ \Rightarrow \ \overline{f\left( \frac{a^2}{\bar{z}} \right)} = \frac{Ua^2}{ z}$, hence using circle theorem,

$$w(z) = U \left(z + \frac{a^2}{z}\right)$$

represents the complex potential of uniform flow over a cylinder.

== See also ==
- Potential flow
- Conformal mapping
- Velocity potential
- Milne-Thomson method for finding a holomorphic function
