= Milne-Thomson method for finding a holomorphic function =

In mathematics, the Milne-Thomson method is a method for finding a holomorphic function whose real or imaginary part is given. It is named after Louis Melville Milne-Thomson.

== Introduction ==
Let $z = x + iy$ and $\bar {z}\ = x - iy$ where $x$ and $y$ are real.

Let $f(z) = u(x,y) + iv(x,y)$ be any holomorphic function.

Example 1: $z^4 = (x^4-6x^2y^2+y^4) +i(4x^3y-4xy^3)$

Example 2: $\exp(iz)=\cos(x)\exp(-y)+i\sin(x)\exp(-y)$

In his article, Milne-Thomson considers the problem of finding $f(z)$ when 1. $u(x,y)$ and $v(x,y)$ are given, 2. $u(x,y)$ is given and $f(z)$ is real on the real axis, 3. only $u(x,y)$ is given, 4. only $v(x,y)$ is given. He is really interested in problems 3 and 4, but the answers to the easier problems 1 and 2 are needed for proving the answers to problems 3 and 4.

== Given both real and imaginary parts ==
Problem: $u(x,y)$ and $v(x,y)$ are known; what is $f(z)$?

Answer: $f(z)=u(z,0)+iv(z,0)$

In words: the holomorphic function $f(z)$ can be obtained by putting $x = z$ and $y = 0$ in $u(x,y)+iv(x,y)$.

Example 1: with $u(x,y)=x^4-6x^2y^2+y^4$ and $v(x,y)=4x^3y-4xy^3$ we obtain $f(z)=z^4$.

Example 2: with $u(x,y)=\cos(x)\exp(-y)$ and $v(x,y)=\sin(x)\exp(-y)$ we obtain $f(z)=\cos(z)+i\sin(z)=\exp(iz)$.

Proof:

From the first pair of definitions $x = \frac{z + \bar {z}}{2}$ and $y = \frac{z - \bar {z}}{2i}$.

Therefore $f(z)= u \left( \frac{z + \bar {z}}{2}\ , \frac{z - \bar {z}}{2i}\right) + iv\left( \frac{z + \bar {z}}{2}\ , \frac{z - \bar {z}}{2i}\right)$.

This is an identity even when $x$ and $y$ are not real, i.e. the two variables $z$ and $\bar {z}\$ may be considered independent. Putting $\bar {z} =z$ we get $f(z) = u(z,0) + iv(z,0)$.

== Given only real part ==
Problem: $u(x,y)$ is known, $v(x,y)$ is unknown, $f(x+i0)$ is real; what is $f(z)$?

Answer: $f(z)=u(z,0)$.

Only example 1 applies here: with $u(x,y)=x^4-6x^2y^2+y^4$ we obtain $f(z)=z^4$.

Proof: "$f(x+i0)$ is real" means $v(x,0)=0$. In this case the answer to problem 1 becomes $f(z)=u(z,0)$.

=== General version ===
Problem: $u(x,y)$ is known, $v(x,y)$ is unknown; what is $f(z)$?

Answer: $f(z)=u(z,0)-i \int u_y(z,0) dz$ (where $u_y(x,y)$ is the partial derivative of $u(x,y)$ with respect to $y$).

Example 1: with $u(x,y)=x^4-6x^2y^2+y^4$ and $u_y(x,y)=-12x^2y+4y^3$ we obtain $f(z)=z^4+iC$ with real but undetermined $C$.

Example 2: with $u(x,y)=\cos(x)\exp(-y)$ and $u_y(x,y)=-\cos(x)\exp(-y)$ we obtain $f(z)=\cos(z)+i\int\cos(z)dz=\cos(z)+i(\sin(z)+C)=\exp(iz)+iC$.

Proof: This follows from $f(z)=u(z,0)+i \int v_x(z,0) dz$ and the 2nd Cauchy-Riemann equation $u_y(x,y)=-v_x(x,y)$.

== Given only imaginary part ==
Problem: $u(x,y)$ is unknown, $v(x,y)$ is known; what is $f(z)$?

Answer: $f(z)=\int v_y(z,0)dz+i v(z,0)$.

Example 1: with $v(x,y)=4x^3y-4xy^3$ and $v_y(x,y)=4x^3-12xy^2$ we obtain $f(z)=\int 4z^3dz+i0=z^4+C$ with real but undetermined $C$.

Example 2: with $v(x,y)=\sin(x)\exp(-y)$ and $v_y(x,y)=-\sin(x)\exp(-y)$ we obtain $f(z)=-\int\sin(z)dz+i\sin(z)=\cos(z)+C+i\sin(z)=\exp(iz)+C$.

Proof: This follows from $f(z)=\int u_x(z,0) dz +i v(z,0)$ and the 1st Cauchy-Riemann equation $u_x(x,y)=v_y(x,y)$.
