= Miquel's theorem =

Concerns 3 circles through triples of points on the vertices and sides of a triangle

A diagram showing circles passing through the vertices of a triangle ABC and points A´, B´ and C´ on the adjacent sides of the triangle intersecting at a common point, M.

Miquel's theorem is a result in geometry, named after Auguste Miquel, concerning the intersection of three circles, each drawn through one vertex of a triangle and two points on its adjacent sides. It is one of several results concerning circles in Euclidean geometry due to Miquel, whose work was published in Liouville's newly founded journal Journal de mathématiques pures et appliquées.

Formally, let ABC be a triangle, with arbitrary points A´, B´ and C´ on sides BC, AC, and AB respectively (or their extensions). Draw three circumcircles (Miquel's circles) to triangles AB´C´, A´BC´, and A´B´C. Miquel's theorem states that these circles intersect in a single point M, called the Miquel point. In addition, the three angles MA´B, MB´C and MC´A (green in the diagram) are all equal, as are the three supplementary angles MA´C, MB´A and MC´B.

The theorem (and its corollary) follow from the properties of cyclic quadrilaterals. Let the circumcircles of A'B'C and AB'C' meet at $M \ne B'.$ Then $\angle A'MC' = 2\pi - \angle B'MA' - \angle C'MB' = 2\pi - (\pi - C) - (\pi - A) = A + C = \pi - B,$ hence BA'MC' is cyclic as desired.

== Pivot theorem ==
The Pivot Theorem for various triangles

If in the statement of Miquel's theorem the points A´, B´ and C´ form a triangle (that is, are not collinear) then the theorem was named the Pivot theorem in Forder (1960, p. 17). (In the diagram these points are labeled P, Q and R.)

If A´, B´ and C´ are collinear then the Miquel point is on the circumcircle of ∆ABC and conversely, if the Miquel point is on this circumcircle, then A´, B´ and C´ are on a line.

== Trilinear coordinates of the Miquel point ==
If the fractional distances of A´, B´ and C´ along sides BC (a), CA (b) and AB (c) are d_{a}, d_{b} and d_{c}, respectively, the Miquel point, in trilinear coordinates (x : y : z), is given by:

$$x=a \left(-a^2 d_a d_a' + b^2 d_a d_b + c^2 d_a' d_c' \right)$$
$$y=b \left(a^2 d_a' d_b' - b^2 d_b d_b' + c^2 d_b d_c \right)$$
$$z=c \left(a^2 d_a d_c + b^2 d_b' d_c' - c^2 d_c d_c' \right),$$

where d'_{a} = 1 - d_{a}, etc.

In the case d_{a} = d_{b} = d_{c} = ½ the Miquel point is the circumcenter (cos α : cos β : cos γ).

== A converse of Miquel's theorem ==
The theorem can be reversed to say: for three circles intersecting at M, a line can be drawn from any point A on one circle, through its intersection C´ with another to give B (at the second intersection). B is then similarly connected, via intersection at A´ of the second and third circles, giving point C. Points C, A and the remaining point of intersection, B´, will then be collinear, and triangle ABC will always pass through the circle intersections A´, B´ and C´.

== Similar inscribed triangle ==
If the inscribed triangle XYZ is similar to the reference triangle ABC, then the point M of concurrence of the three circles is fixed for all such XYZ.

== Miquel and Steiner's quadrilateral theorem ==
Miquel and Steiner's Quadrilateral Theorem

The circumcircles of all four triangles of a complete quadrilateral meet at a point M. In the diagram above these are ∆ABF, ∆CDF, ∆ADE and ∆BCE.

This result was announced, in two lines, by Jakob Steiner in the 1827/1828 issue of Gergonne's Annales de Mathématiques, but a detailed proof was given by Miquel.

== Miquel's pentagon theorem ==
Let ABCDE be a convex pentagon. Extend all sides until they meet in five points F,G,H,I,K and draw the circumcircles of the five triangles CFD, DGE, EHA, AIB and BKC. Then the second intersection points (other than A,B,C,D,E), namely the new points M,N,P,R and Q are concyclic (lie on a circle). See diagram.

The converse result is known as the Five circles theorem.

Miquel's Pentagon Theorem

== Miquel's six circle theorem ==
Miquel's six circles theorem states that if five circles share four triple-points of intersection then the remaining four points of intersection lie on a sixth circle

Given points, A, B, C, and D on a circle, and circles passing through each adjacent pair of points, the alternate intersections of these four circles at W, X, Y and Z then lie on a common circle. This is known as the six circles theorem. It is also known as the four circles theorem and while generally attributed to Jakob Steiner the only known published proof was given by Miquel. David G. Wells refers to this as Miquel's theorem.

== Three-dimensional version of Miquel's theorem ==
There is also a three-dimensional analog, in which the four spheres passing through a point of a tetrahedron and points on the edges of the tetrahedron intersect in a common point.

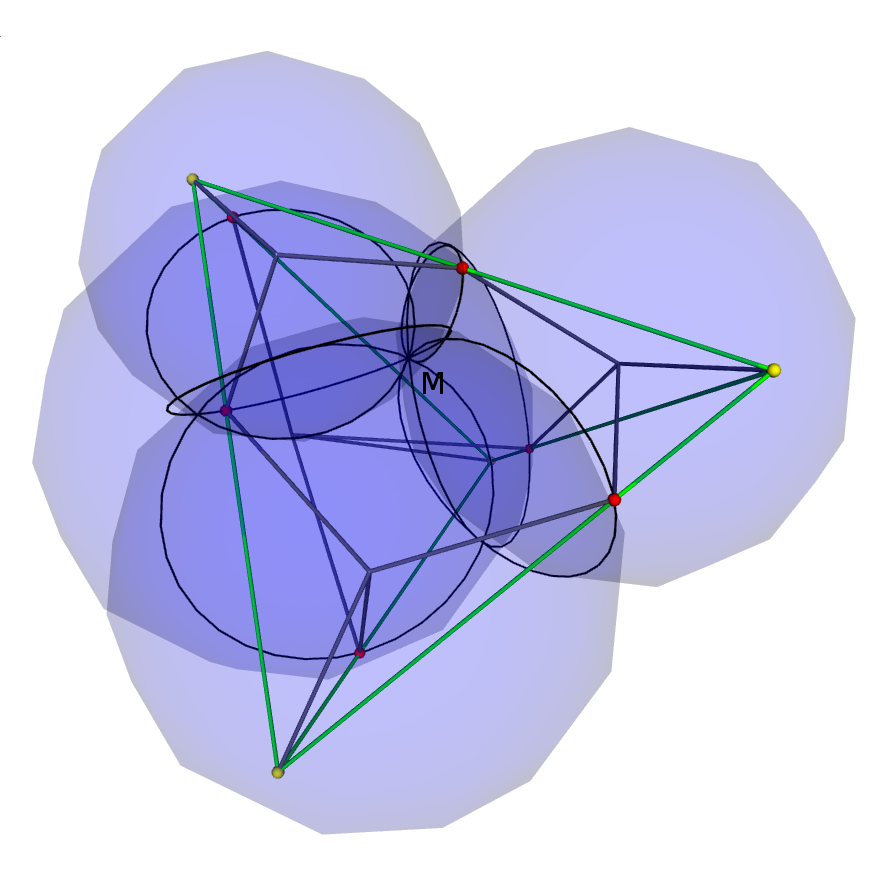
The three-dimensional case: the four spheres intercepts other spheres on black circles.

== See also ==
- Bundle theorem
- Clifford's circle theorems
- Miquel configuration
