= Six circles theorem =

Relates to a chain of six circles together with a triangle

Some examples of theorem configuration changing the radius of the first circle. In the last configuration the circles are pairwise coincident.

In geometry, the six circles theorem relates to a chain of six circles together with a triangle, such that each circle is tangent to two sides of the triangle and also to the preceding circle in the chain. The chain closes, in the sense that the sixth circle is always tangent to the first circle. It is assumed in this construction that all circles lie within the triangle, and all points of tangency lie on the sides of the triangle. If the problem is generalized to allow circles that may not be within the triangle, and points of tangency on the lines extending the sides of the triangle, then the sequence of circles eventually reaches a periodic sequence of six circles, but may take arbitrarily many steps to reach this periodicity.

The name may also refer to Miquel's six circles theorem, the result that if five circles have four triple points of intersection then the remaining four points of intersection lie on a sixth circle.
