= Clifford's circle theorems =

Sequence of theorems relating to sets of circles intersecting at a common point

In geometry, Clifford's theorems, named after the English geometer William Kingdon Clifford, are a sequence of theorems relating to intersections of circles.

== Statement ==
The first theorem considers any four circles passing through a common point M and otherwise in general position, meaning that there are six additional points where exactly two of the circles cross and that no three of these crossing points are collinear. Every set of three of these four circles has among them three crossing points, and (by the assumption of non-collinearity) there exists a circle passing through these three crossing points. The conclusion is that, like the first set of four circles, the second set of four circles defined in this way all pass through a single point P (in general not the same point as M).

The second theorem considers five circles in general position passing through a single point M. Each subset of four circles defines a new point P according to the first theorem. Then these five points all lie on a single circle C.

The third theorem considers six circles in general position that pass through a single point M. Each subset of five circles defines a new circle by the second theorem. Then these six new circles C all pass through a single point.

The sequence of theorems can be continued indefinitely.

== See also ==
- Cox's chain
- Five circles theorem
- Miquel's six circles theorem
