= L. M. Milne-Thomson =

English applied mathematician

Louis Melville Milne-Thomson
- Born: 1 May 1891; Ealing, London, England
- Died: 21 August 1974 (aged 83); Sevenoaks, Kent, England
- Education: Clifton College; Corpus Christi College
- Known for: Milne-Thomson circle theorem
- Scientific career
- Fields: Applied mathematics, Hydrodynamics
- Workplaces: Winchester College; Royal Naval College; University of Arizona

Louis Melville Milne-Thomson CBE FRSE RAS (1 May 1891 – 21 August 1974) was an English applied mathematician who wrote several classic textbooks on applied mathematics, including The Calculus of Finite Differences, Theoretical Hydrodynamics, and Theoretical Aerodynamics. He is also known for developing several mathematical tables such as Jacobian Elliptic Function Tables. The Milne-Thomson circle theorem and the Milne-Thomson method for finding a holomorphic function are named after him. Milne-Thomson was made a Commander of the Order of the British Empire (CBE) in 1952.

== Early years and career ==
Milne-Thomson was born in Ealing, London, England on 1 May 1891 to Colonel Alexander Milne-Thomson, a physician and Eva Mary Milne, the daughter of the Revd J. Milne. He was the eldest of his parents' sons. He studied at Clifton College in Bristol as a classical scholar for three years. After securing a scholarship, Milne-Thomson joined Corpus Christi College, Cambridge in 1909 and received part I of the Mathematical Tripos in 1911. He graduated with distinction as a Wrangler in 1913.

In 1914 Milne-Thomson joined Winchester College in Hampshire as an assistant mathematics master and taught there for next seven years. In 1921 he was appointed professor of mathematics at the Royal Naval College, Greenwich and remained there until retirement at the age of 65.

In 1933 he was elected a Fellow of the Royal Society of Edinburgh. His proposers were Bevan Baker, John Marshall, Edward Thomas Copson, and Herbert Turnbull.

After retiring from the Royal Naval College, Milne-Thomson took up various posts as Visiting Professor at various institutions around the world, including the Brown University at Rhode Island, the US Army Mathematics Research Center at the University of Wisconsin (1958–1960), the University of Arizona (1961–1970), University of Rome (1968), the University of Queensland (1969), the University of Calgary (1970), and finally the University of Otago (1971). At the end of a long career Milne-Thomson quit academia in 1971 and went to live in Sevenoaks, Kent where he died at the age of 83.

== Work ==
During the early stages of his career, he developed and compiled several mathematical tables such as the Standard Four Figure Mathematical Tables jointly constructed with L. J. Comrie and published in 1931, Standard Table of Square Roots (1932), and Jacobian Elliptic Function Tables (1932). Later, Milne-Thomson wrote the chapters on Elliptic Integrals and Jacobian Elliptic Functions in the classic NBS AMS 55 handbook.

In 1933 Milne-Thomson published his first book, The Calculus of Finite Differences which became a classic textbook and the original text was reprinted in 1951. In the mid 1930s, Milne-Thomson developed an interest in hydrodynamics and later in aerodynamics. This led to publication of two popular textbooks titled Theoretical Hydrodynamics and Theoretical Aerodynamics. The Theoretical Hydrodynamics published by Macmillan & Co. Ltd., London, appeared in 1938 and more material based on his own research was added in the subsequent editions of this classic book. The fifth edition appeared thirty years later in 1968. The book was republished by Dover Publications in 1996. Similarly, Theoretical Aerodynamics, first published in 1948, went through a number of editions with the fourth appearing in 1968.
