= Niels Erik Nørlund =

Danish mathematician (1885–1981)

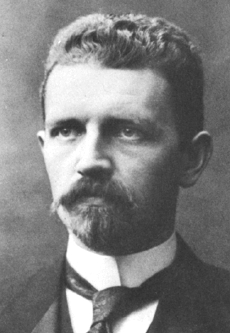
- Born: 26 October 1885; Slagelse, Denmark
- Died: 4 July 1981 (aged 95); Copenhagen, Denmark
- Scientific career
- Fields: Mathematics

Niels Erik Nørlund ForMemRS (26 October 1885, in Slagelse – 4 July 1981, in Copenhagen) was a Danish mathematician.

His book Vorlesungen über Differenzenrechnung (1924, reprinted 1954) was the first book on complex function solutions of difference equations. His doctoral students include Georg Rasch.

The Norlund Alps and Norlund Land in Greenland were named after him.

He was also the brother of Margrethe Nørlund Bohr and brother-in-law of Nobel Prize winning physicist Niels Bohr.

== Selected works ==
- Vorlesungen über Differenzenrechnung. Berlin: Springer-Verlag. 1924.
- with René Lagrange as editor: Leçons sur les équations linéaires aux différences finies. Paris: Gauthier-Villars. 1929.
- Vermessungsarbeiten in Grönland, Island und Dänemark. Darmstadt: Vereinigung von Freunden der TH Darmstadt. 1939.
- "The logarithmic solutions of the hypergeometric equation". K. Dan. Vidensk. Selsk. Mat. Fys. SKR. 5: 1–58. 1963.

== See also ==
- Nörlund–Rice integral
- Inge Lehmann
- Indefinite sum
