= Solid trigonometry =

Solid trigonometry may refer to:

- solid geometry, geometry of three-dimensional Euclidean space
- spherical trigonometry, deals with the trigonometric functions of the sides and angles of the spherical polygons
