= Birkhoff's axioms =

Theoretical framework for planar Euclidean geometry

In 1932, G. D. Birkhoff created a set of four postulates of Euclidean geometry in the plane, sometimes referred to as Birkhoff's axioms. These postulates are all based on basic geometry that can be confirmed experimentally with a scale and protractor. Since the postulates build upon the real numbers, the approach is similar to a model-based introduction to Euclidean geometry.

Birkhoff's axiomatic system was utilized in the secondary-school textbook by Birkhoff and Beatley. These axioms were also modified by the School Mathematics Study Group to provide a new standard for teaching high school geometry, known as SMSG axioms. A few other textbooks in the foundations of geometry use variants of Birkhoff's axioms.

== Birkhoff's four postulates ==
The distance between two points A and B is denoted by d(A, B), and the angle formed by three points A, B, C is denoted by ∠ ABC.

Postulate I: Postulate of line measure. The set of points {A, B, ...} on any line can be put into a 1:1 correspondence with the real numbers {a, b, ...} so that |b − a| = d(A, B) for all points A and B.

Postulate II: Point-line postulate. There is one and only one line ℓ that contains any two given distinct points P and Q.

Postulate III: Postulate of angle measure. The set of rays {ℓ, m, n, ...} through any point O can be put into 1:1 correspondence with the real numbers a (mod 2π) so that if A and B are points (not equal to O) of ℓ and m, respectively, the difference a_{m} − a_{ℓ} (mod 2π) of the numbers associated with the lines ℓ and m is ∠ AOB. Furthermore, if the point B on m varies continuously in a line r not containing the vertex O, the number a_{m} varies continuously also.

Postulate IV: Postulate of similarity. Given two triangles ABC and A'B'C' and some constant k > 0 such that d(A', B' ) = kd(A, B), d(A', C' ) = kd(A, C) and ∠ B'A'C' = ±∠ BAC, then d(B', C' ) = kd(B, C), ∠ C'B'A' = ±∠ CBA, and ∠ A'C'B' = ±∠ ACB.

== See also ==
- Euclidean geometry
- Euclidean space
- Foundations of geometry
- Hilbert's axioms
- Tarski's axioms
