= Corresponding sides and corresponding angles =

Method of testing congruence of polygons

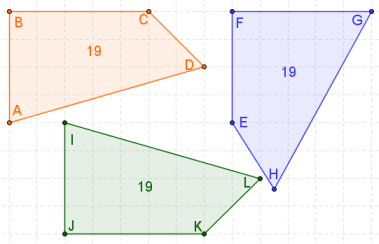
The orange and green quadrilaterals are congruent; the blue one is not congruent to them. Congruence between the orange and green ones is established in that side B̅C̅ corresponds to (in this case of congruence, equals in length) J̅K̅, C̅D̅ corresponds to K̅L̅, D̅A̅ corresponds to L̅I̅, and A̅B̅ corresponds to I̅J̅, while angle ∠C corresponds to (equals) angle ∠K, ∠D corresponds to ∠L, ∠A corresponds to ∠I, and ∠B corresponds to ∠J.

In geometry, the tests for congruence and similarity involve comparing corresponding sides and corresponding angles of polygons. In these tests, each side and each angle in one polygon is paired with a side or angle in the second polygon, taking care to preserve the order of adjacency.

For example, if one polygon has sequential sides a, b, c, d, and e and the other has sequential sides v, w, x, y, and z, and if b and w are corresponding sides, then side a (adjacent to b) must correspond to either v or x (both adjacent to w). If a and v correspond to each other, then c corresponds to x, d corresponds to y, and e corresponds to z; hence the ith element of the sequence abcde corresponds to the ith element of the sequence vwxyz for i = 1, 2, 3, 4, 5. On the other hand, if in addition to b corresponding to w we have c corresponding to v, then the ith element of abcde corresponds to the ith element of the reverse sequence xwvzy.

Congruence tests look for all pairs of corresponding sides to be equal in length, though except in the case of the triangle this is not sufficient to establish congruence (as exemplified by a square and a rhombus that have the same side length). Similarity tests look at whether the ratios of the lengths of each pair of corresponding sides are equal, though again this is not sufficient. In either case equality of corresponding angles is also necessary; equality (or proportionality) of corresponding sides combined with equality of corresponding angles is necessary and sufficient for congruence (or similarity). The corresponding angles as well as the corresponding sides are defined as appearing in the same sequence, so for example if in a polygon with the side sequence abcde and another with the corresponding side sequence vwxyz we have vertex angle a appearing between sides a and b then its corresponding vertex angle v must appear between sides v and w.

== See also ==
- Transversal (geometry) § Corresponding angles
