= Synthetic geometry =

Geometry without using coordinates

Synthetic geometry (sometimes referred to as axiomatic geometry or even pure geometry) is geometry without the use of coordinates. It relies on the axiomatic method for proving all results from a few basic properties, initially called postulates and at present called axioms.

After the 17th-century introduction by René Descartes of the coordinate method, which was called analytic geometry, the term "synthetic geometry" was coined to refer to the older methods that were, before Descartes, the only known ones.

According to Felix Klein,

Synthetic geometry is that which studies figures as such, without recourse to formulae, whereas analytic geometry consistently makes use of such formulae as can be written down after the adoption of an appropriate system of coordinates.

The first systematic approach to synthetic geometry is Euclid's Elements. However, it appeared at the end of the 19th century that Euclid's postulates were not sufficient for characterizing geometry. The first complete axiom system for geometry was given only at the end of the 19th century by David Hilbert. At the same time, it appeared that both synthetic methods and analytic methods can be used to build geometry. The fact that the two approaches are equivalent has been proved by Emil Artin in his book Geometric Algebra.

Because of this equivalence, the distinction between synthetic and analytic geometry is no more in use, except at elementary level, or for geometries that are not related to any sort of numbers, such as some finite geometries and non-Desarguesian geometry.

== Logical synthesis ==
The process of logical synthesis begins with some arbitrary but definite starting point. This starting point is the introduction of primitive notions or primitives and axioms about these primitives:

- Primitives are the most basic ideas. Typically they include both objects and relationships. In geometry, the objects are things such as points, lines and planes, while a fundamental relationship is that of incidence – of one object meeting or joining with another. The terms themselves are undefined. Hilbert once remarked that instead of points, lines and planes one might just as well talk of tables, chairs and beer mugs, the point being that the primitive terms are just empty placeholders and have no intrinsic properties.
- Axioms are statements about these primitives; for example, any two points are together incident with just one line (i.e., that for any two points, there is just one line which passes through both of them). Axioms are assumed true, and not proven. They are the building blocks of geometric concepts, since they specify the properties that the primitives have.

From a given set of axioms, synthesis proceeds as a carefully constructed logical argument. When a significant result is proved rigorously, it becomes a theorem.

=== Properties of axiom sets ===
There is no fixed axiom set for geometry, as more than one consistent set can be chosen. Each such set may lead to a different geometry, while there are also examples of different sets giving the same geometry. With this plethora of possibilities, it is no longer appropriate to speak of "geometry" in the singular.

Historically, Euclid's parallel postulate has turned out to be independent of the other axioms. Simply discarding it gives absolute geometry, while negating it yields hyperbolic geometry. Other consistent axiom sets can yield other geometries, such as projective, elliptic, spherical or affine geometry.

Axioms of continuity and "betweenness" are also optional; for example, discrete geometries may be created by discarding or modifying them.

Following the Erlangen program of Klein, the nature of any given geometry can be seen as the connection between symmetry and the content of the propositions, rather than the style of development.

== History ==
Euclid's original treatment remained unchallenged for over two thousand years, until the simultaneous discoveries of the non-Euclidean geometries by Gauss, Bolyai, Lobachevsky and Riemann in the 19th century led mathematicians to question Euclid's underlying assumptions.

The early French analyst Sylvestre François Lacroix (1816) summarized synthetic geometry this way:

The Elements of Euclid are treated by the synthetic method. This author, after having posed the axioms, and formed the requisites, established the propositions which he proves successively being supported by that which preceded, proceeding always from the simple to compound, which is the essential character of synthesis.

The heyday of synthetic geometry is considered to have been the 19th century, when analytic methods based on coordinates and calculus were ignored by some geometers such as Jakob Steiner, in favor of a purely synthetic development of projective geometry. For example, the treatment of the projective plane starting from axioms of incidence is a broader theory (with more models) than is found by starting with a third dimensional vector space.

In his Erlangen program, Felix Klein played down the tension between synthetic and analytic methods:

The distinction between modern synthesis and modern analytic geometry must no longer be regarded as essential, inasmuch as both subject-matter and methods of reasoning have gradually taken a similar form in both. We choose therefore in the text as common designation of them both the term projective geometry. Although the synthetic method has more to do with space-perception and thereby imparts a rare charm to its first simple developments, the realm of space-perception is nevertheless not closed to the analytic method, and the formulae of analytic geometry can be looked upon as a precise and perspicuous statement of geometrical relations. On the other hand, the advantage to original research of a well formulated analysis should not be underestimated, - an advantage due to its moving, so to speak, in advance of the thought. But it should always be insisted that a mathematical subject is not to be considered exhausted until it has become intuitively evident, and the progress made by the aid of analysis is only a first, though a very important, step.

The close axiomatic study of Euclidean geometry led to the construction of the Lambert quadrilateral and the Saccheri quadrilateral. These structures introduced the field of non-Euclidean geometry where Euclid's parallel axiom is denied. Gauss, Bolyai and Lobachevski independently constructed hyperbolic geometry, where parallel lines have an angle of parallelism that depends on their separation. This study became widely accessible through the Poincaré disc model where motions are given by Möbius transformations. Similarly, Riemann, a student of Gauss's, constructed Riemannian geometry, of which elliptic geometry is a particular case.

Another example concerns inversive geometry as advanced by Ludwig Immanuel Magnus, which can be considered synthetic in spirit. The closely related operation of reciprocation expresses analysis of the plane.

Karl von Staudt showed that algebraic axioms, such as commutativity and associativity of addition and multiplication, were in fact consequences of incidence of lines in geometric configurations. David Hilbert showed that the Desargues configuration played a special role. Further work was done by Ruth Moufang and her students. The concepts have been one of the motivators of incidence geometry.

When parallel lines are taken as primary, synthesis produces affine geometry. Though Euclidean geometry is both an affine and metric geometry, in general affine spaces may be missing a metric. The extra flexibility thus afforded makes affine geometry appropriate for the study of spacetime, as discussed in the history of affine geometry.

In 1955, Herbert Busemann and Paul J. Kelley sounded a nostalgic note for synthetic geometry:

Although reluctantly, geometers must admit that the beauty of synthetic geometry has lost its appeal for the new generation. The reasons are clear: not so long ago synthetic geometry was the only field in which the reasoning proceeded strictly from axioms, whereas this appeal — so fundamental to many mathematically interested people — is now made by many other fields.

For example, college studies now include linear algebra, topology, and graph theory where the subject is developed from first principles, and propositions are deduced by elementary proofs. Expecting to replace synthetic with analytic geometry leads to loss of geometric content.

Today's student of geometry has axioms other than Euclid's available.

Ernst Kötter published a German report in 1901 on The development of synthetic geometry from Monge to Staudt (1847).

== Proofs using synthetic geometry ==
Synthetic proofs of geometric theorems make use of auxiliary constructs (such as helping lines) and concepts such as equality of sides or angles, and similarity and congruence of triangles. Examples include the Butterfly theorem, Angle bisector theorem, Apollonius' theorem, British flag theorem, Ceva's theorem, Equal incircles theorem, Geometric mean theorem, Heron's formula, Isosceles triangle theorem, and Law of cosines.

== Computational synthetic geometry ==
Computational synthetic geometry studies "what could be roughly described as computer-aided geometric reasoning." Topics in CSG include decision procedures for the realizability of matroids over a given vector space and formal verification of the foundations of geometry.

Synthetic differential geometry applies topos theory to the foundations of differentiable manifold theory.

== See also ==
- Coordinate-free
- Foundations of geometry
- Hilbert's axioms
- Incidence geometry
- Synthetic differential geometry
- Tarski's axioms
