= G. B. Halsted =

American mathematician

George Bruce Halsted
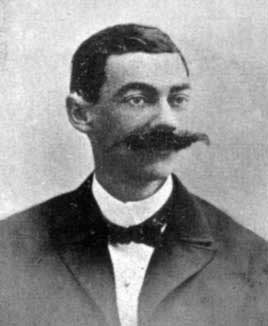
- G. B. Halsted, geometer
- Born: November 25, 1853; Newark, New Jersey, US
- Died: March 16, 1922 (aged 68); New York City, New York, US
- Education: Princeton University; Johns Hopkins University
- Known for: Foundations of geometry
- Spouse: Margaret Swearingen
- Scientific career
- Fields: Geometry
- Workplaces: University of Texas, Austin; Kenyon College; Colorado State Teachers College
- Thesis: Basis for a Dual Logic (1879)
- Doctoral advisor: J. J. Sylvester
- Notable students: R. L. Moore; L. E. Dickson

George Bruce Halsted (November 25, 1853 – March 16, 1922), usually cited as G. B. Halsted, was an American mathematician who explored foundations of geometry and introduced non-Euclidean geometry into the United States through his translations of works by Bolyai, Lobachevski, Saccheri, and Poincaré. He wrote an elementary geometry text, Rational Geometry, based on Hilbert's axioms, which was translated into French, German, and Japanese. Halsted produced original works in synthetic geometry, first with an elementary text in 1896, and with a text on synthetic projective geometry in 1906.

== Life ==
Halsted was a fourth generation Princeton University graduate, earning his bachelor's degree in 1875 and his Master's in 1878. While a student at Princeton, Halsted was a tutor and held a mathematical fellowship. He went on to Johns Hopkins University where he was J. J. Sylvester's first student, receiving his Ph.D. in 1879. After graduation, Halsted served as an instructor in mathematics at Princeton until beginning his post at the University of Texas at Austin in 1884.

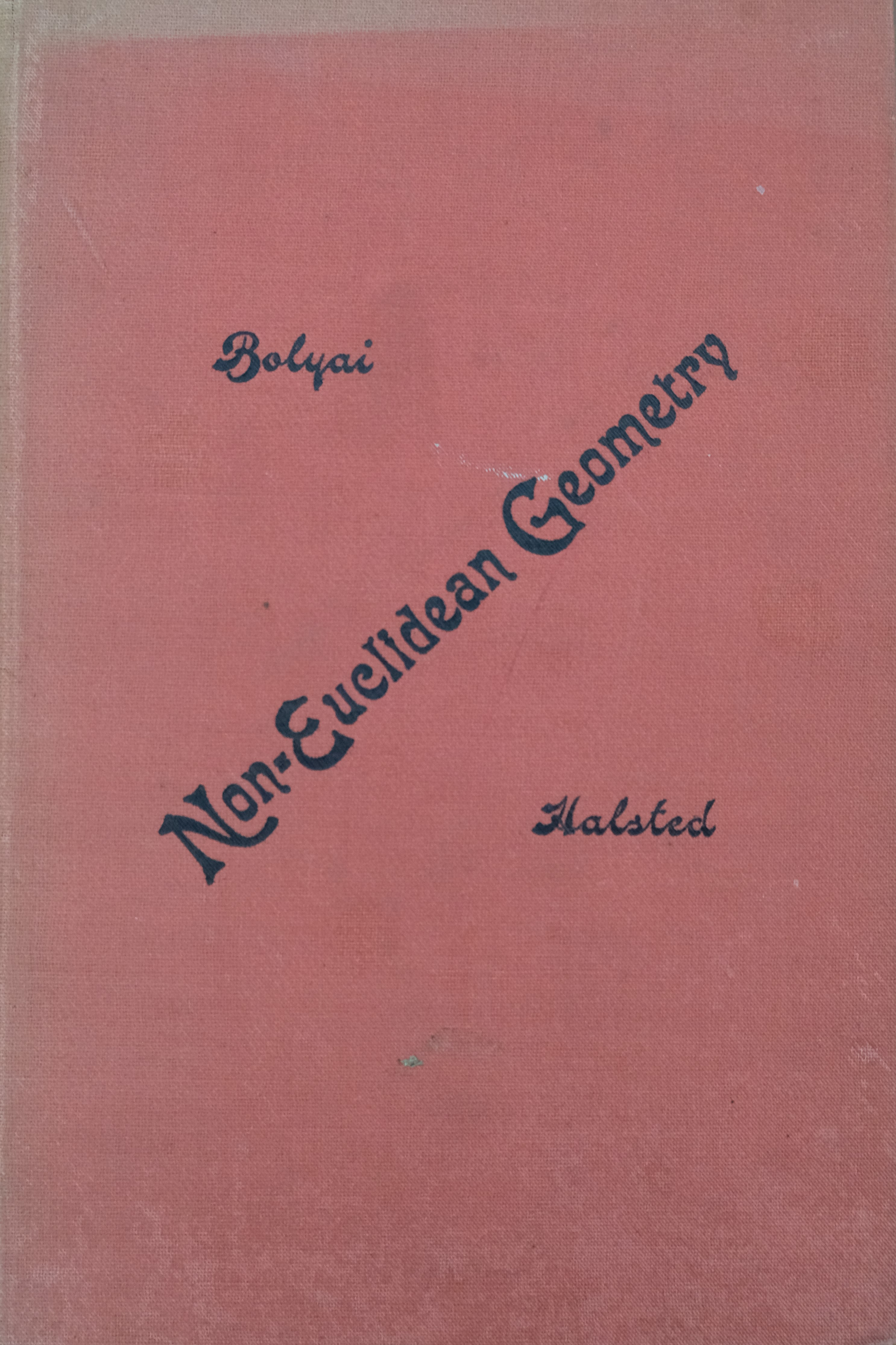
1896 copy of János Bolyai's "The science absolute of space, independent of the truth or falsity of Euclid's axiom XI (which can never be decided a priori)," translated from Latin by Halsted

From 1884 to 1903, Halsted was a member of the University of Texas at Austin Department of Pure and Applied Mathematics, eventually becoming its chair. He taught mathematicians R. L. Moore and L. E. Dickson, among other students. He explored the foundations of geometry and many alternatives to Euclid's development, culminating with his Rational Geometry. In the interest of hyperbolic geometry in 1891 he translated the work of Nicolai Lobachevsky on theory of parallels. In 1893 in Chicago, Halsted read a paper Some salient points in the history of non-Euclidean and hyper-spaces at the International Mathematical Congress held in connection with the World's Columbian Exposition. Halsted frequently contributed to the early American Mathematical Monthly. In one article he championed the role of J. Bolyai in the development of non-Euclidean geometry and criticized C. F. Gauss. See also the letter from Robert Gauss to Felix Klein on 3 September 1912.

In 1903, Halsted was fired from UT Austin after having published several articles that criticized the university for having passed over R. L. Moore, at that time a young and promising mathematician whom Halsted hoped to have as an assistant, for an instructor post in favor of a well-connected but less qualified candidate with roots in the area. He completed his teaching career at St. John's College, Annapolis; Kenyon College, Gambier, Ohio (1903–1906); and the Colorado State Teachers College, Greeley (1906–1914).

In 1913 Science Press published three translations by Halsted of popular science works by Henri Poincaré. In a preface, Poincaré paid tribute to Halsted's inter-continental reach: He "has already taken the trouble to translate many European treatises and thus powerfully contributed to make the new continent understand the thought of the old."

Halsted was a member of the American Mathematical Society and served as vice president of the American Association for the Advancement of Science. He was elected Fellow of the Royal Astronomical Society in 1905.

== Synthetic projective geometry ==
Halsted introduced conics after the manner of a Steiner conic, here shown from a projectivity composed of two perspectivities $\pi_A, \pi_B$

In 1896 Halsted published a chapter on synthetic geometry pertaining to three-dimensional projective geometry in Higher Mathematics distributed by Mansfield Merriman and Robert S. Woodward. In 1906 Synthetic Projective Geometry was published separately in 241 articles and 61 problems. A bibliography referring to Chasles, Steiner, and Clebsch appears on page 24. There are four pages of index, 58 of text, and a lyrical preface: "Man imprisoned in a little body, with short-arm hands instead of wings, created for his guidance a mole geometry, tactile space, codified by Euclid in his immortal Elements, whose basal principle is congruence, measurement. Yet man is no mole. Infinite feelers radiate from the windows of his soul, whose wings touch the fixed stars. The angel of light in him created for the guidance of eye-life an independent system, a radiant geometry, a visual space, codified in 1847 by a new Euclid, by the Erlangen professor, George von Staudt, in his immortal Geometrie der Lage, published in the quaint and ancient Nurnberg of Albrecht Durer."

By developing concepts of eject and cut, the text relates abstraction to practice in perspective drawing or a picture plane (page 10). A line is called a straight and includes a figurative point. Halsted uses the approach of a Steiner conic in article 77 for the definition of a conic: "If two coplanar non-copunctual flat pencils are projective but not perspective, the crosses of correlated straights form a 'range of the second degree' or 'conic range'." The eject of a conic is a cone, while the cut of a cone is a conic.

Since four arbitrary points in a plane have six connectors, there are three more points determined by the crosses of the connectors. Halted calls the original four points dots and the extra three codots. Standard nomenclature refers to the configuration as a complete quadrangle while Halsted says tetrastim. Each codot corresponds to a pair of opposite connectors. Four harmonic points are defined "if the first and third are codots of a tetrastim while the others are on the connectors of the third codot" (pages 15, 16).

For a given conic C, a point Z has a corresponding straight the polar of Z and Z is the pole of this straight: Through Z draw two secants through C crossing at AD and BC. Consider the tetrastim ABCD, which has Z as a codot. Then the polar of Z is the straight through the other two codots of ABCD (page 25). Continuing with conics, conjugate diameters are straights, each of which is the polar of the figurative point of the other (page 32).

== Publications ==
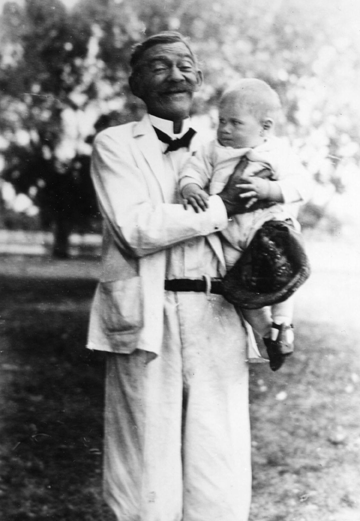
George Halsted holding grandson, 1920

- Metrical geometry; An elementary treatise on mensuration (Boston, Ginn, 1890), link from Internet Archive.
- The Elements of Geometry (New York, Wiley, 1889), @ Internet Archive.
- Elementary Synthetic Geometry (New York, Wiley, 1896) @ Internet Archive
- Synthetic Projective Geometry (New York, Wiley, 1906), @ Internet Archive.
- On the Foundation and Technic of Arithmetic (Chicago, Open Court, 1912), @ Internet Archive.

=== Translations ===
- Lobachevsky (1897) New Principles of Geometry with a Complete Theory of Parallels, (Austin, Neomon) link from Yale University
- Henri Poincaré (1913) The Foundations of Science via Project Gutenberg
- János Bolyai (1896) The science absolute of space, independent of the truth of falsity of Euclid's axiom XI (which can never be decided a priori), from the Niels Bohr Library & Archives at the American Institute of Physics
- Girolamo Saccheri (1920)[1733] Euclides Vindicatus 2nd ed. (1986), review by John Corcoran: Mathematical Reviews 88j:01013, 1988.

== See also ==
- Foundations of geometry
