= Axiomatic geometry =

Axiomatic geometry may refer to:

- Foundations of geometry: the study of the axioms of geometry.
- Synthetic geometry: the coordinate-free study of geometry.
