= Sum of angles of a triangle =

Fundamental result in geometry

In a Euclidean space, the sum of angles of a triangle equals a straight angle (180 degrees, π radians, two right angles, or a half-turn). A triangle has three angles, and has one at each vertex, bounded by a pair of adjacent sides.

The sum can be computed directly using the definition of angle based on the dot product and trigonometric identities, or more quickly by reducing to the two-dimensional case and using Euler's identity.

It was unknown for a long time whether other geometries exist, for which this sum is different. The influence of this problem on mathematics was particularly strong during the 19th century. Ultimately, the answer was proven to be positive: in other spaces (geometries) this sum can be greater or lesser, but it then must depend on the triangle. Its difference from 180° is a case of angular defect and serves as an important distinction for geometric systems.

Equivalence of the parallel postulate and the "sum of the angles equals to 180°" statement

== Cases ==
=== Euclidean geometry ===
In Euclidean geometry, the triangle postulate states that the sum of the angles of a triangle is two right angles. This postulate is equivalent to the parallel postulate. In the presence of the other axioms of Euclidean geometry, the following statements are equivalent:

- Triangle postulate: The sum of the angles of a triangle is two right angles.
- Playfair's axiom: Given a straight line and a point not on the line, exactly one straight line may be drawn through the point parallel to the given line.
- Proclus' axiom: If a line intersects one of two parallel lines, it must intersect the other also.
- Equidistance postulate: Parallel lines are everywhere equidistant (i.e. the distance from each point on one line to the other line is always the same.)
- Triangle area property: The area of a triangle can be as large as we please.
- Three points property: Three points either lie on a line or lie on a circle.
- Pythagoras' theorem: In a right-angled triangle, the square of the hypotenuse equals the sum of the squares of the other two sides.

=== Spherical geometry ===
Spherical geometry does not satisfy several of Euclid's axioms, including the parallel postulate. In addition, the sum of angles is not 180°.

For a spherical triangle, the sum of the angles is greater than 180° and can be up to 540°. The amount by which the sum of the angles exceeds 180° is called the spherical excess, denoted as $E$ or $\Delta$. The spherical excess and the area $A$ of the triangle determine each other via the relation (called Girard's theorem):
$$E = \frac{A}{r^2}$$
where $r$ is the radius of the sphere, equal to $r = \frac{1}{\sqrt{\kappa}}$ where $\kappa > 0$ is the constant curvature.

The spherical excess can also be calculated from the three side lengths, the lengths of two sides and their angle, or the length of one side and the two adjacent angles (see spherical trigonometry).

In the limit where the three side lengths tend to $0$, the spherical excess also tends to $0$: the spherical geometry locally resembles the Euclidean one. More generally, the Euclidean law is recovered as a limit when the area tends to $0$ (which does not imply that the side lengths do so).

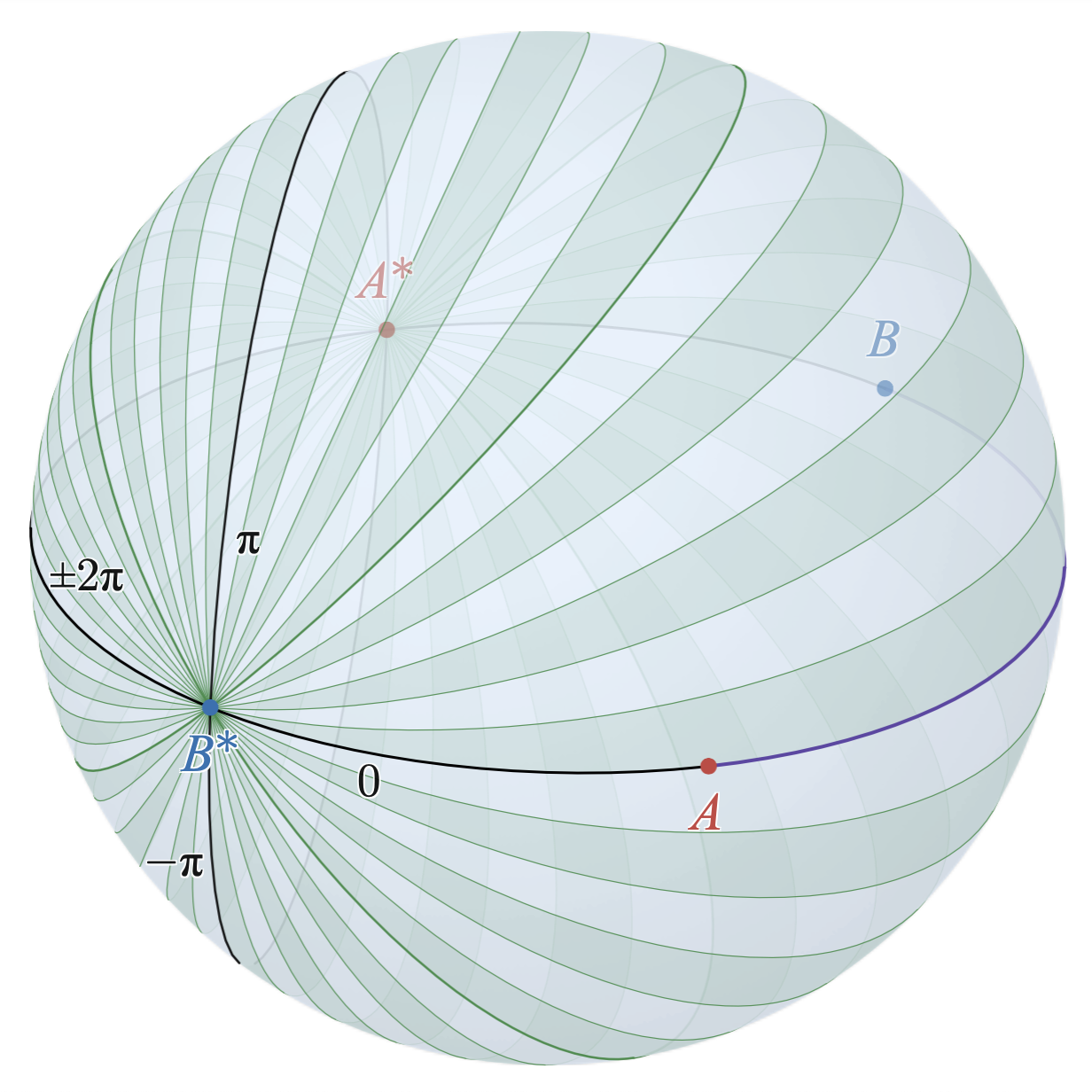
A foliation of the sphere by Lexell's loci

A spherical triangle is determined up to isometry by $E$, one side length and one adjacent angle. More precisely, according to Lexell's theorem, given a spherical segment $[A, B]$ as a fixed side and a number $0^\circ < E < 360^\circ$, the set of points $C$ such that the triangle $ABC$ has spherical excess $E$ is a circle through the antipodes $A', B'$ of $A$ and $B$. Hence, the level sets of $E$ form a foliation of the sphere with two singularities $A', B'$, and the gradient vector of $E$ is orthogonal to this foliation.

=== Hyperbolic geometry ===
Hyperbolic geometry breaks Playfair's axiom, Proclus' axiom (the parallelism, defined as non-intersection, is intransitive in an hyperbolic plane), the equidistance postulate (the points on one side of, and equidistant from, a given line do not form a line), and Pythagoras' theorem. A circle cannot have arbitrarily small curvature, so the three points property also fails.

Contrarily to the spherical case, the sum of the angles of a hyperbolic triangle is less than 180°, and can be arbitrarily close to 0°. Thus one has an angular defect
$$D = 180^\circ - \text{sum of angles}.$$
As in the spherical case, the angular defect $D$ and the area $A$ determine each other: one has
$$D = \frac{A}{r^2}$$
where $r = \frac{1}{\sqrt{-\kappa}}$ and $\kappa < 0$ is the constant curvature. This relation was first proven by Johann Heinrich Lambert. One sees that all triangles have area bounded by $180^\circ \times r^2$.

As in the spherical case, $D$ can be calculated using the three side lengths, the lengths of two sides and their angle, or the length of one side and the two adjacent angles (see hyperbolic trigonometry).

Once again, the Euclidean law is recovered as a limit when the side lengths (or, more generally, the area) tend to $0$. Letting the lengths all tend to infinity, however, causes $D$ to tend to 180°, i.e. the three angles tend to 0°. One can regard this limit as the case of ideal triangles, joining three points at infinity by three bi-infinite geodesics. Their area is the limit value $A = 180^\circ \times {r^2}$.

Lexell's theorem also has a hyperbolic counterpart: instead of circles, the level sets become pairs of curves called hypercycles, and the foliation is non-singular.

== Taxicab geometry ==
In Taxicab Geometry, a type of non-Euclidean geometry where distance is measured using the Manhattan metric (only horizontal and vertical moves are allowed, like a grid), the concept of angle sum in a triangle becomes ambiguous. In some interpretations, the sum of angles in a taxicab triangle can still be 180°, but the way angles are measured differs from Euclidean space. Right angles can stretch or contract depending on the definition used, making the sum of angles a more flexible concept than in standard Euclidean geometry.

This discrepancy arises because, in taxicab geometry, the shortest path between two points is not necessarily a straight line in the Euclidean sense but rather a series of horizontal and vertical segments. As a result, the definition of angles depends on the chosen metric, leading to alternative ways of measuring them. For example, in some interpretations, a "right angle" may still resemble the familiar 90° turn, while in others, it may stretch depending on the path taken. This flexibility in angle measurement makes taxicab geometry a fascinating field of study, particularly in urban planning, computer science, and optimization problems, where grid-based movement is common.

== Exterior angles ==
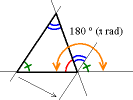
The picture shows exterior angles along with interior ones, for the rightmost vertex it is shown as =/~~)~~

Angles between adjacent sides of a triangle are referred to as interior angles in Euclidean and other geometries. Exterior angles can also be defined, and the Euclidean triangle postulate can be formulated as the exterior angle theorem. One can also consider the sum of all three exterior angles, which equals 360° in the Euclidean case (as for any convex polygon), is less than 360° in the spherical case, and is greater than 360° in the hyperbolic case.

== In differential geometry ==
In the differential geometry of surfaces, the question of a triangle's angular defect is understood as a special case of the Gauss-Bonnet theorem where the curvature of a closed curve is not a function, but a measure with the support in exactly three points – vertices of a triangle.

== See also ==
- Euclid's Elements
- Foundations of geometry
- Hilbert's axioms
- Saccheri quadrilateral
- Lambert quadrilateral
