= Point–line–plane postulate =

In geometry, the point–line–plane postulate is a collection of assumptions (axioms) that can be used in a set of postulates for Euclidean geometry in two (plane geometry), three (solid geometry) or more dimensions.

== Assumptions ==
The following are the assumptions of the point-line-plane postulate:

- Unique line assumption. There is exactly one line passing through two distinct points.
- Number line assumption. Every line is a set of points which can be put into a one-to-one correspondence with the real numbers. Any point can correspond with 0 (zero) and any other point can correspond with 1 (one).
- Dimension assumption. Given a line in a plane, there exists at least one point in the plane that is not on the line. Given a plane in space, there exists at least one point in space that is not in the plane.
- Flat plane assumption. If two points lie in a plane, the line containing them lies in the plane.
- Unique plane assumption. Through three non-collinear points, there is exactly one plane.
- Intersecting planes assumption. If two different planes have a point in common, then their intersection is a line.

The first three assumptions of the postulate, as given above, are used in the axiomatic formulation of the Euclidean plane in the secondary school geometry curriculum of the University of Chicago School Mathematics Project (UCSMP).

== History ==
The axiomatic foundation of Euclidean geometry can be dated back to the books known as Euclid's Elements (circa 300 B.C.). These five initial axioms (called postulates by the ancient Greeks) are not sufficient to establish Euclidean geometry. Many mathematicians have produced complete sets of axioms which do establish Euclidean geometry. One of the most notable of these is due to Hilbert who created a system in the same style as Euclid. Unfortunately, Hilbert's system requires 21 axioms. Other systems have used fewer (but different) axioms. The most appealing of these, from the viewpoint of having the fewest axioms, is due to G.D. Birkhoff (1932) which has only four axioms. These four are: the Unique line assumption (which was called the Point-Line Postulate by Birkhoff), the Number line assumption, the Protractor postulate (to permit the measurement of angles) and an axiom that is equivalent to Playfair's axiom (or the parallel postulate). For pedagogical reasons, a short list of axioms is not desirable and starting with the New math curricula of the 1960s, the number of axioms found in high school level textbooks has increased to levels that even exceed Hilbert's system.
