= Crossbar theorem =

Geometric theorem

The Crossbar Theorem says ray AD intersects segment BC

In geometry, the crossbar theorem states that if ray AD is between ray AC and ray AB, then ray AD intersects line segment BC.

This result is one of the deeper results in axiomatic plane geometry. It is often used in proofs to justify the statement that a line through a vertex of a triangle lying inside the triangle meets the side of the triangle opposite that vertex. This property was often used by Euclid in his proofs without explicit justification.

Some modern treatments (not Euclid's) of the proof of the theorem that the base angles of an isosceles triangle are congruent start like this: Let ABC be a triangle with side AB congruent to side AC. Draw the angle bisector of angle A and let D be the point at which it meets side BC. And so on. The justification for the existence of point D is the often unstated crossbar theorem. For this particular result, other proofs exist which do not require the use of the crossbar theorem.

== See also ==
- Foundations of geometry
- Jordan curve theorem
