= Absolute geometry =

Geometry without the parallel postulate

Absolute geometry is a geometry based on an axiom system for Euclidean geometry without the parallel postulate or any of its alternatives. Traditionally, this has meant using only the first four of Euclid's postulates. The term was introduced by János Bolyai in 1832. It is sometimes referred to as neutral geometry, as it is neutral with respect to the parallel postulate. The first four of Euclid's postulates are now known to be an insufficient basis for Euclidean geometry, so other systems (such as Hilbert's axioms without the parallel axiom) are used instead.

== Properties ==
In Euclid's Elements, the first 28 Propositions and Proposition 31 avoid using the parallel postulate, and therefore are valid in absolute geometry. One can also prove in absolute geometry the exterior angle theorem (an exterior angle of a triangle is larger than either of the remote angles), as well as the Saccheri–Legendre theorem, which states that the sum of the measures of the angles in a triangle has at most 180°.

Proposition 31 is the construction of a parallel line to a given line through a point not on the given line. As the proof only requires the use of Proposition 27 (the Alternate Interior Angle Theorem), it is a valid construction in absolute geometry. More precisely, given any line l and any point P not on l, there is at least one line through P which is parallel to l. This can be proved using a familiar construction: given a line l and a point P not on l, drop the perpendicular m from P to l, then erect a perpendicular n to m through P. By the alternate interior angle theorem, l is parallel to n. (The alternate interior angle theorem states that if lines a and b are cut by a transversal t such that there is a pair of congruent alternate interior angles, then a and b are parallel.) The foregoing construction, and the alternate interior angle theorem, do not depend on the parallel postulate and are therefore valid in absolute geometry.

In absolute geometry, it is also provable that two lines perpendicular to the same line cannot intersect (i.e., must be parallel).

== Relation to other geometries ==
The theorems of absolute geometry hold in hyperbolic geometry, which is a non-Euclidean geometry, as well as in Euclidean geometry. Absolute geometry is inconsistent with elliptic geometry or spherical geometry: the notion of ordering or betweenness of points on lines, used to axiomatize absolute geometry, is inconsistent with these other geometries.

Absolute geometry is an extension of ordered geometry, and thus, all theorems in ordered geometry hold in absolute geometry. The converse is not true. Absolute geometry assumes the first four of Euclid's Axioms (or their equivalents), to be contrasted with affine geometry, which does not assume Euclid's third and fourth axioms. (3: "To describe a circle with any centre and distance radius.", 4: "That all right angles are equal to one another." ) Ordered geometry is a common foundation of both absolute and affine geometry.

The geometry of special relativity has been developed starting with nine axioms and eleven propositions of absolute geometry. The authors Edwin B. Wilson and Gilbert N. Lewis then proceed beyond absolute geometry when they introduce hyperbolic rotation as the transformation relating two frames of reference.

== Hilbert planes ==
A plane that satisfies Hilbert's Incidence, Betweenness and Congruence axioms is called a Hilbert plane. Hilbert planes are models of absolute geometry.

== Incompleteness ==
Absolute geometry is an incomplete axiomatic system, in the sense that one can add extra independent axioms without making the axiom system inconsistent. One can extend absolute geometry by adding various axioms about parallel lines and get mutually incompatible but internally consistent axiom systems, giving rise to Euclidean or hyperbolic geometry. Thus every theorem of absolute geometry is a theorem of hyperbolic geometry and Euclidean geometry. However the converse is not true.

== See also ==
- Affine geometry
- Erlangen program
- Foundations of geometry
- Incidence geometry
- Non-Euclidean geometry
