= Alessandro Padoa =

Italian mathematician and logician (1868–1937)

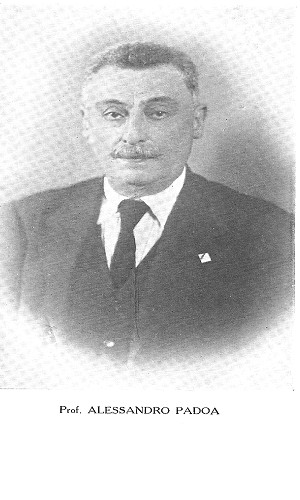
- Born: 14 October 1868; Venice, Italy
- Died: 25 November 1937 (aged 69); Genoa, Italy
- Scientific career
- Fields: Mathematics

Alessandro Padoa (14 October 1868 – 25 November 1937) was an Italian mathematician and logician, a contributor to the school of Giuseppe Peano. He is remembered for a method for deciding whether, given some formal theory, a new primitive notion is truly independent of the other primitive notions. There is an analogous problem in axiomatic theories, namely deciding whether a given axiom is independent of the other axioms.

The following description of Padoa's career is included in a biography of Peano:

He attended secondary school in Venice, engineering school in Padua, and the University of Turin, from which he received a degree in mathematics in 1895. Although he was never a student of Peano, he was an ardent disciple and, from 1896 on, a collaborator and friend. He taught in secondary schools in Pinerolo, Rome, Cagliari, and (from 1909) at the Technical Institute in Genoa. He also held positions at the Normal School in Aquila and the Naval School in Genoa, and, beginning in 1898, he gave a series of lectures at the Universities of Brussels, Pavia, Berne, Padua, Cagliari, and Geneva. He gave papers at congresses of philosophy and mathematics in Paris, Cambridge, Livorno, Parma, Padua, and Bologna. In 1934 he was awarded the ministerial prize in mathematics by the Accademia dei Lincei (Rome).

The congresses in Paris in 1900 were particularly notable. Padoa's addresses at these congresses have been well remembered for their clear and unconfused exposition of the modern axiomatic method in mathematics. In fact, he is said to be "the first … to get all the ideas concerning defined and undefined concepts completely straight".

== Congressional addresses ==
=== Philosophers' congress ===
At the International Congress of Philosophy Padoa spoke on "Logical Introduction to Any Deductive Theory". He says

during the period of elaboration of any deductive theory we choose the ideas to be represented by the undefined symbols and the facts to be stated by the unproved propositions; but, when we begin to formulate the theory, we can imagine that the undefined symbols are completely devoid of meaning and that the unproved propositions (instead of stating facts, that is, relations between the ideas represented by the undefined symbols) are simply conditions imposed upon undefined symbols.
Then, the system of ideas that we have initially chosen is simply one interpretation of the system of undefined symbols; but from the deductive point of view this interpretation can be ignored by the reader, who is free to replace it in his mind by another interpretation that satisfies the conditions stated by the unproved propositions. And since the propositions, from the deductive point of view, do not state facts, but conditions, we cannot consider them genuine postulates.

Padoa went on to say:

...what is necessary to the logical development of a deductive theory is not the empirical knowledge of the properties of things, but the formal knowledge of relations between symbols.

=== Mathematicians' congress ===
Padoa spoke at the 1900 International Congress of Mathematicians with his title "A New System of Definitions for Euclidean Geometry". At the outset he discusses the various selections of primitive notions in geometry at the time:

The meaning of any of the symbols that one encounters in geometry must be presupposed, just as one presupposes that of the symbols which appear in pure logic. As there is an arbitrariness in the choice of the undefined symbols, it is necessary to describe the chosen system. We cite only three geometers who are concerned with this question and who have successively reduced the number of undefined symbols, and through them (as well as through symbols that appear in pure logic) it is possible to define all the other symbols.
First, Moritz Pasch was able to define all the other symbols through the following four:

1. point 2. segment (of a line)
3. plane 4. is superimposable upon

Then, Giuseppe Peano was able in 1889 to define plane through point and segment. In 1894 he replaced is superimposable upon with motion in the system of undefined symbols, thus reducing the system to symbols:

1. point 2. segment 3. motion

Finally, in 1899 Mario Pieri was able to define segment through point and motion. Consequently, all the symbols that one encounters in Euclidean geometry can be defined in terms of only two of them, namely

1. point 2. motion

Padoa completed his address by suggesting and demonstrating his own development of geometric concepts. In particular, he showed how he and Pieri define a line in terms of collinear points.

== Bibliography ==
- A. Padoa (1900) "Logical introduction to any deductive theory" in Jean van Heijenoort, 1967. A Source Book in Mathematical Logic, 1879–1931. Harvard Univ. Press: 118–23.
- A. Padoa (1900) "Un Nouveau Système de Définitions pour la Géométrie Euclidienne", Proceedings of the International Congress of Mathematicians, tome 2, pages 353–63.

Secondary:

- Ivor Grattan-Guinness (2000) The Search for Mathematical Roots 1870–1940. Princeton Uni. Press.
- H.C. Kennedy (1980) Peano, Life and Works of Giuseppe Peano, D. Reidel ISBN 90-277-1067-8 .
- Suppes, Patrick (1957, 1999) Introduction to Logic, Dover. Discusses "Padoa's method."
- Smith, James T. (2000), Methods of Geometry, John Wiley & Sons, ISBN 0-471-25183-6
- Jean Van Heijenoort (ed.) (1967) From Frege to Gödel. Cambridge: Harvard University Press
