= Playfair's axiom =

Modern formulation of Euclid's parallel postulate

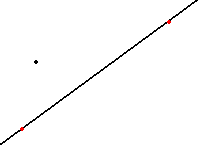
Antecedent of Playfair's axiom: a line and a point not on the line

Consequent of Playfair's axiom: a second line, parallel to the first, passing through the point

In geometry, Playfair's axiom is an axiom that can be used instead of the fifth postulate of Euclid (the parallel postulate):

In a plane, given a line and a point not on it, at most one line parallel to the given line can be drawn through the point.

It is equivalent to Euclid's parallel postulate in the context of Euclidean geometry and was named after the Scottish mathematician John Playfair. The "at most" clause is all that is needed since it can be proved from the first four axioms and the further axiom—"two lines have at most one intersection point"—that at least one parallel line exists given a line L and a point P not on L, as follows:

1. Construct a perpendicular: Using the axioms and previously established theorems, you can construct a line perpendicular to line L that passes through P.
2. Construct another perpendicular: A second perpendicular line is drawn to the first one, starting from point P.
3. Parallel Line: This second perpendicular line will be parallel to L, since all interior angles are right angles, and there is in Euclid's Elements a proof, using the additional axiom, that L and the additional line do not intersect.

The statement is often written with the phrase, "there is one and only one parallel". In Euclid's Elements, two lines are said to be parallel if they never meet.

This axiom is used not only in Euclidean geometry but also in the broader affine geometry. In this geometry the parallel postulate cannot be stated since right angles are not defined and the concept of parallelism is central. In the affine geometry setting, the stronger form of Playfair's axiom (where "at most one" is replaced by "one and only one") is needed since the axioms of neutral geometry are not present to provide a proof of existence. Playfair's version of the axiom has become so popular that it is often referred to as Euclid's parallel axiom, even though it was not Euclid's version of the axiom.

== History ==
Proclus (410–485 A.D.) clearly makes the statement in his commentary on Euclid I.31 (Book I, Proposition 31).

In 1785 William Ludlam expressed the parallel axiom as follows:

Two straight lines, meeting at a point, are not both parallel to a third line.

This brief expression of Euclidean parallelism was adopted by Playfair in his textbook Elements of Geometry (1795) that was republished often. He wrote

Two straight lines which intersect one another cannot be both parallel to the same straight line.

Playfair acknowledged Ludlam and others for simplifying the Euclidean assertion. In later developments the point of intersection of the two lines came first, and the denial of two parallels became expressed as a unique parallel through the given point.

In 1883 Arthur Cayley was president of the British Association and expressed this opinion in his address to the Association:

My own view is that Euclid's Twelfth Axiom in Playfair's form of it, does not need demonstration, but is part of our notion of space, of the physical space of our experience, which is the representation lying at the bottom of all external experience.

When David Hilbert wrote his book, Foundations of Geometry (1899), providing a new set of axioms for Euclidean geometry, he used Playfair's form of the axiom instead of the original Euclidean version for discussing parallel lines.

== Relation with Euclid's fifth postulate ==
If the sum of the interior angles α and β is less than 180°, the two straight lines, produced indefinitely, meet on that side.

Euclid's parallel postulate states:

If a line segment intersects two straight lines forming two interior angles on the same side that sum to less than two right angles, then the two lines, if extended indefinitely, meet on that side on which the angles sum to less than two right angles.

The complexity of this statement when compared to Playfair's formulation is certainly a leading contribution to the popularity of quoting Playfair's axiom in discussions of the parallel postulate.

Within the context of absolute geometry the two statements are equivalent, meaning that each can be proved by assuming the other in the presence of the remaining axioms of the geometry. This is not to say that the statements are logically equivalent (i.e., one can be proved from the other using only formal manipulations of logic), since, for example, when interpreted in the spherical model of elliptical geometry one statement is true and the other isn't. Logically equivalent statements have the same truth value in all models in which they have interpretations.

The proofs below assume that all the axioms of absolute (neutral) geometry are valid.

=== Euclid's fifth postulate implies Playfair's axiom ===
The easiest way to show this is using the Euclidean theorem (equivalent to the fifth postulate) that states that the angles of a triangle sum to two right angles. Given a line $\ell$ and a point P not on that line, construct a line, t, perpendicular to the given one through the point P, and then a perpendicular to this perpendicular at the point P. This line is parallel because it cannot meet $\ell$ and form a triangle, which is stated in Book 1 Proposition 27 in Euclid's Elements. Now it can be seen that no other parallels exist. If n was a second line through P, then n makes an acute angle with t (since it is not the perpendicular) and the hypothesis of the fifth postulate holds, and so, n meets $\ell$.

=== Playfair's axiom implies Euclid's fifth postulate ===
The fifth postulate can "apparently" be proven in this manner. If the lines in Euclidean construction meet on the side where interior angles sum to greater than two right angles, we would have a triangle whose two angles sum to an angle greater than two right angles, which is contrary to Proposition 1.17. Therefore, they must meet on the side where interior angles sum to less than two right angles.

However, this assumes that the lines will meet. What we have proven is that "If lines meet, then they must meet on the side where interior angles sum to less than two right angles." Playfair's axiom guarantees that the lines must meet by assuming beforehand that there be only one parallel line from a given point (namely, the perpendicular of a perpendicular). All other lines through P, are not parallel, and hence, must meet.

=== Importance of triangle congruence ===
The classical equivalence between Playfair's axiom and Euclid's fifth postulate collapses in the absence of triangle congruence. This is shown by constructing a geometry that redefines angles in a way that respects Hilbert's axioms of incidence, order, and congruence, except for the side–angle–side (SAS) congruence. This geometry models the classical Playfair's axiom but not Euclid's fifth postulate.

== Transitivity of parallelism ==
Proposition 30 of Euclid reads, "Two lines, each parallel to a third line, are parallel to each other." It was noted by Augustus De Morgan that this proposition is logically equivalent to Playfair’s axiom. This notice was recounted by T. L. Heath in 1908. De Morgan’s argument runs as follows: Let X be the set of pairs of distinct lines which meet and Y the set of distinct pairs of lines each of which is parallel to a single common line. If z represents a pair of distinct lines, then the statement

For all z, if z is in X then z is not in Y

is Playfair's axiom (in De Morgan's terms, No X is Y) and its logically equivalent contrapositive,

For all z, if z is in Y then z is not in X,

is Euclid I.30, the transitivity of parallelism (No Y is X).

More recently the implication has been phrased differently in terms of the binary relation expressed by parallel lines: In affine geometry the relation is taken to be an equivalence relation, which means that a line is considered to be parallel to itself. Andy Liu wrote, "Let P be a point not on line 2. Suppose both line 1 and line 3 pass through P and are parallel to line 2. By transitivity, they are parallel to each other, and hence cannot have exactly P in common. It follows that they are the same line, which is Playfair's axiom."
