= Primitive notion =

Concept that is not defined in terms of previously defined concepts

In mathematics, logic, philosophy, and formal systems, a primitive notion is a concept that is not defined in terms of previously defined concepts. It is often motivated informally, usually by an appeal to intuition or taken to be self-evident. In an axiomatic theory, relations between primitive notions are restricted by axioms. Some authors refer to the latter as "defining" primitive notions by one or more axioms, but this can be misleading. Formal theories cannot dispense with primitive notions, under pain of infinite regress.

For example, in contemporary geometry, point, line, and contains are some primitive notions.

== Details ==
Alfred Tarski explained the role of primitive notions as follows:

When we set out to construct a given discipline, we distinguish, first of all, a certain small group of expressions of this discipline that seem to us to be immediately understandable; the expressions in this group we call PRIMITIVE TERMS or UNDEFINED TERMS, and we employ them without explaining their meanings. At the same time we adopt the principle: not to employ any of the other expressions of the discipline under consideration, unless its meaning has first been determined with the help of primitive terms and of such expressions of the discipline whose meanings have been explained previously. The sentence which determines the meaning of a term in this way is called a DEFINITION,...

An inevitable regress to primitive notions in the theory of knowledge was explained by Gilbert de B. Robinson:

To a non-mathematician it often comes as a surprise that it is impossible to define explicitly all the terms which are used. This is not a superficial problem but lies at the root of all knowledge; it is necessary to begin somewhere, and to make progress one must clearly state those elements and relations which are undefined and those properties which are taken for granted.

== Examples ==
The necessity for primitive notions is illustrated in several axiomatic foundations in mathematics:

- Set theory: The concept of the set is an example of a primitive notion. As Mary Tiles writes: [The] 'definition' of 'set' is less a definition than an attempt at explication of something which is being given the status of a primitive, undefined, term. As evidence, she quotes Felix Hausdorff: "A set is formed by the grouping together of single objects into a whole. A set is a plurality thought of as a unit."
- Naive set theory: The empty set is a primitive notion. To assert that it exists would be an implicit axiom.
- Peano arithmetic: The successor function and the number zero are primitive notions. Since Peano arithmetic is useful in regards to properties of the numbers, the objects that the primitive notions represent may not strictly matter.
- Arithmetic of real numbers: Typically, primitive notions are: real number, two binary operations: addition and multiplication, numbers 0 and 1, ordering.
- Axiomatic systems: The primitive notions will depend upon the set of axioms chosen for the system. Alessandro Padoa discussed this selection at the International Congress of Philosophy in Paris in 1900. The notions themselves may not necessarily need to be stated; Susan Haack (1978) writes, "A set of axioms is sometimes said to give an implicit definition of its primitive terms."
- Euclidean geometry: Under Hilbert's axiom system the primitive notions are point, line, plane, congruence, betweenness , and incidence.
- Euclidean geometry: Under Peano's axiom system the primitive notions are point, segment, and motion.

== Russell's primitives ==
In his book on philosophy of mathematics, The Principles of Mathematics Bertrand Russell used the following notions: for class-calculus (set theory), he used relations, taking set membership as a primitive notion. To establish sets, he also establishes propositional functions as primitive, as well as the phrase "such that" as used in set builder notation. (pp 18,9) Regarding relations, Russell takes as primitive notions the converse relation and complementary relation of a given xRy. Furthermore, logical products of relations and relative products of relations are primitive. (p 25) As for denotation of objects by description, Russell acknowledges that a primitive notion is involved. (p 27) The thesis of Russell's book is "Pure mathematics uses only a few notions, and these are logical constants." (p xxi)

== See also ==
- Axiomatic set theory
- Foundations of geometry
- Foundations of mathematics
- Logical atomism
- Logical constant
- Mathematical logic
- Notion (philosophy)
- Natural semantic metalanguage
