= János Bolyai =

Hungarian mathematician (1802–1860)

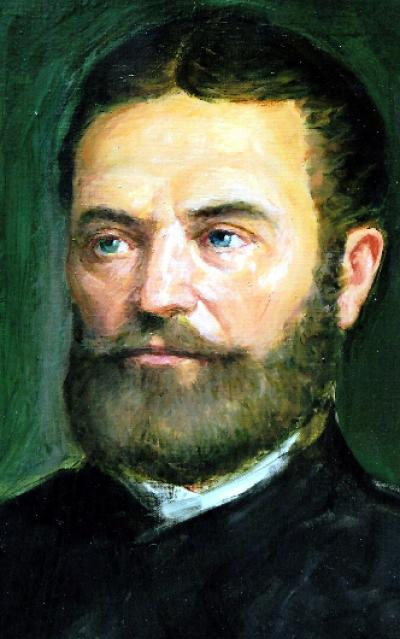
- Fantasy portrait by Ferenc Márkos (2012)
- Born: 15 December 1802; Kolozsvár, Kingdom of Hungary, Habsburg Monarchy (today Cluj-Napoca, Romania)
- Died: 27 January 1860 (aged 57); Marosvásárhely, Kingdom of Hungary, Austrian Empire (today Târgu Mureș, Romania)
- Education: TherMilAk (diploma, 1822)
- Known for: Non-Euclidean geometry
- Scientific career
- Fields: Mathematics
- Academic advisors: Farkas Bolyai

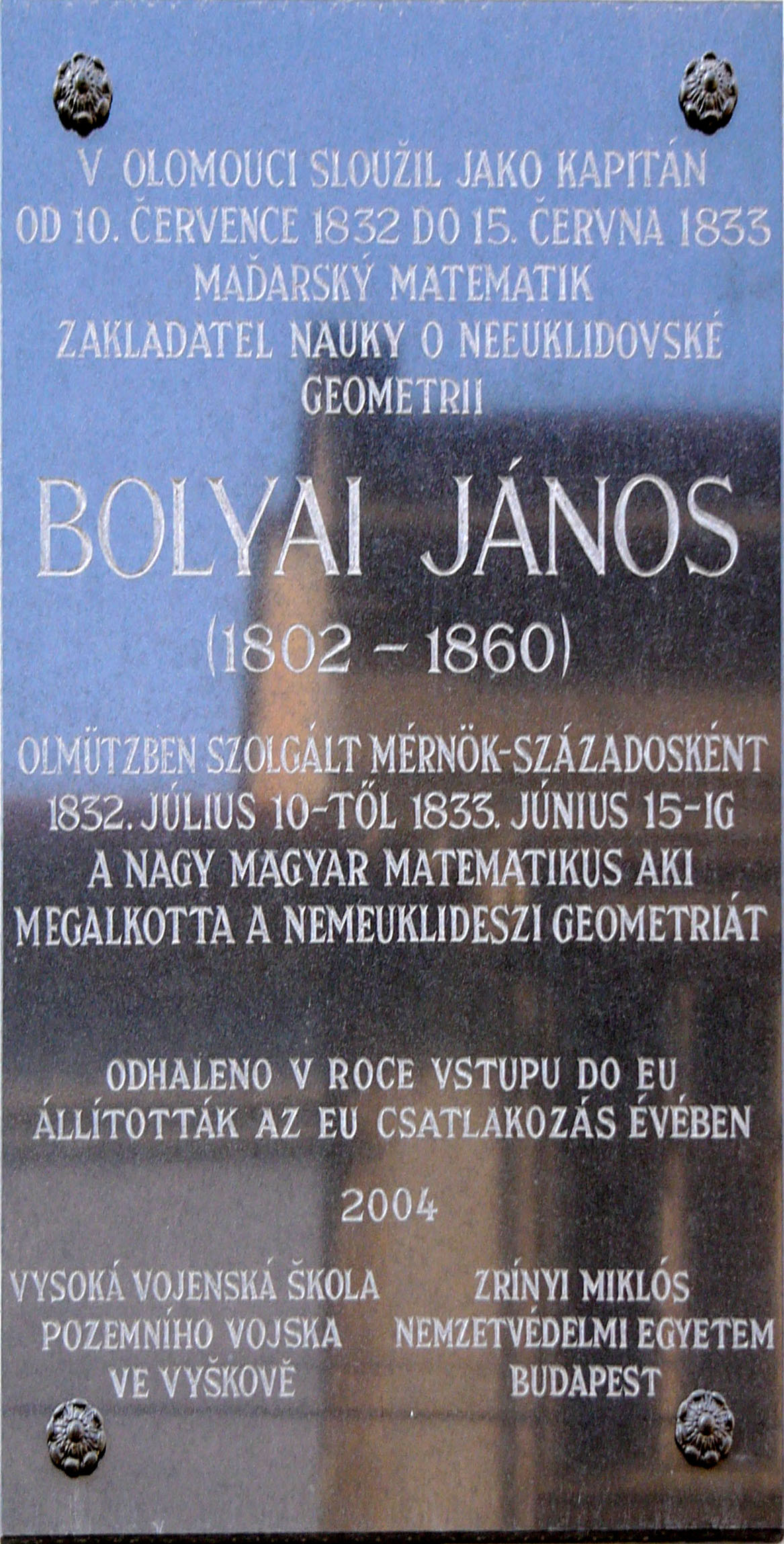
Memorial plaque of János Bolyai in Olomouc, Czech Republic

János Bolyai (/ˈbɔːljɔɪ/; Hungarian: [ˈjaːnoʃ ˈboːjɒi]; 15 December 1802 – 27 January 1860) or Johann Bolyai, was a Hungarian mathematician who developed absolute geometry—a geometry that includes both Euclidean geometry and hyperbolic geometry. The discovery of a consistent alternative geometry that might correspond to the structure of the universe helped to free mathematicians to study abstract concepts irrespective of any possible connection with the physical world.

== Early life ==
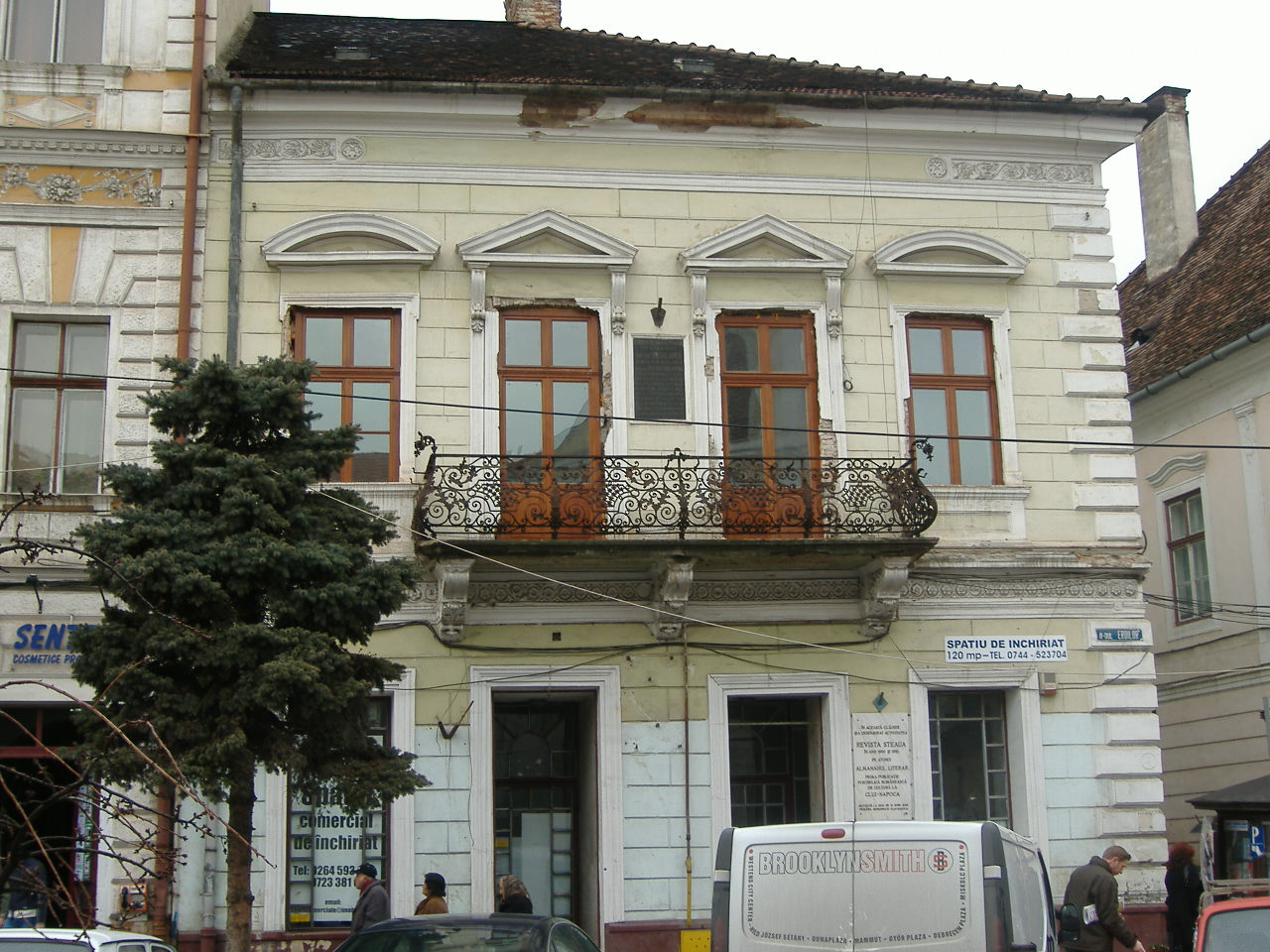
The house in Cluj-Napoca where János Bolyai was born

Bolyai was born in the town of Kolozsvár, Grand Principality of Transylvania, Kingdom of Hungary (now Cluj-Napoca in Romania), the son of Zsuzsanna Benkő and the well-known mathematician Farkas Bolyai.

By the age of 13, he had mastered calculus and other forms of analytical mechanics, receiving instruction from his father. He studied at the Imperial and Royal Military Academy (TherMilAk) in Vienna from 1818 to 1822, and Bolyai received his commission as sub-lieutenant. At the age of 21, he was already a lieutenant, at the age of 22, a first lieutenant and at the age of 24, a captain.

== Career ==
Bolyai became so obsessed with Euclid's parallel postulate that his father, who had pursued the same subject for many years, wrote to him in 1820: "You must not attempt this approach to parallels. I know this way to the very end. I have traversed this bottomless night, which extinguished all light and joy in my life. I entreat you, leave the science of parallels alone...Learn from my example."

János, however, persisted in his quest and eventually came to the conclusion that the postulate is independent of the other axioms of geometry and that different consistent geometries can be constructed on its negation. In 1823, he wrote to his father: "I have discovered such wonderful things that I was amazed...out of nothing I have created a strange new universe." Between 1820 and 1823 he had prepared a treatise on parallel lines that he called absolute geometry. Bolyai's work was published in 1832 as an appendix to a mathematics textbook by his father.

Carl Friedrich Gauss, on reading the Appendix, wrote in a letter, "I regard this young geometer Bolyai as a genius of the first order." To his old friend Farkas Bolyai, however, Gauss wrote: "To praise it would amount to praising myself. For the entire content of the work...coincides almost exactly with my own meditations which have occupied my mind for the past thirty or thirty-five years." Indeed, Gauss had disclosed his discovery of a consistent non-Euclidean geometry in a letter in 1827, and in 1829 wrote that he feared backlash if he published about it. János suspected that Gauss had been secretly informed about his discoveries by his father, causing a rift between him and his father. He later bitterly complained about Gauss's attitude.

In 1848 Bolyai learned that Nikolai Ivanovich Lobachevsky had published a piece of work similar to his appendix in 1829. Though Lobachevsky published his work a few years earlier than Bolyai, it contained only hyperbolic geometry. Working independently, Bolyai and Lobachevsky pioneered the investigation of non-Euclidean geometry.

In addition to his work in geometry, Bolyai developed a rigorous geometric concept of complex numbers as ordered pairs of real numbers. Although he never published more than the 24 pages of the Appendix, he left more than 20,000 pages of mathematical manuscripts when he died. These can now be found in the Teleki-Bolyai Library in Târgu Mureș, where Bolyai died. His grave lies in the Lutheran Cemetery in Târgu Mureș.

== Personal life ==
He was an accomplished linguist, speaking several foreign languages beside his native Hungarian, these being German, Latin, French, Italian and Romanian. He learned the violin and performed in Vienna.

It is related of him that he was challenged by thirteen officers of his garrison, a thing not unlikely to happen considering how differently he thought from everyone else. He fought them all in succession—making it his only condition that he should be allowed to play on his violin for an interval between meeting each opponent. He disarmed or wounded all his antagonists. It can be easily imagined that a temperament such as his was not one congenial to his military superiors. He was retired in 1833.

No original portrait of Bolyai survives. An unauthentic picture appears in some encyclopedias and on a Hungarian postage stamp.

== Legacy ==
The Babeș-Bolyai University in Cluj-Napoca, that was established in 1959, bears his name, as does the professional society of Hungarian mathematicians, the János Bolyai Mathematical Institute, at the University of Szeged. There is also a mathematical award given out every five years, named the Bolyai Prize. Bolyai is a minor character in the 1969 science-fiction/fantasy story "Operation Changeling", where his unique abilities allow the protagonists to navigate the non-Euclidean geometry of Hell.

The crater Bolyai on the Moon and 1441 Bolyai, a minor planet discovered in 1937, are also named after him.

Several primary and secondary schools in the Carpathian Basin also bear Bolyai's name; for instance, Bolyai János Műszaki Szakközépiskola in Budapest, Bolyai János Gyakorló Általános Iskola és Gimnázium in Szombathely, and the Bolyai János Általános Iskola in Debrecen. Streets in Budapest, Cluj-Napoca, and Timișoara are named after Bolyai.

== Gallery ==
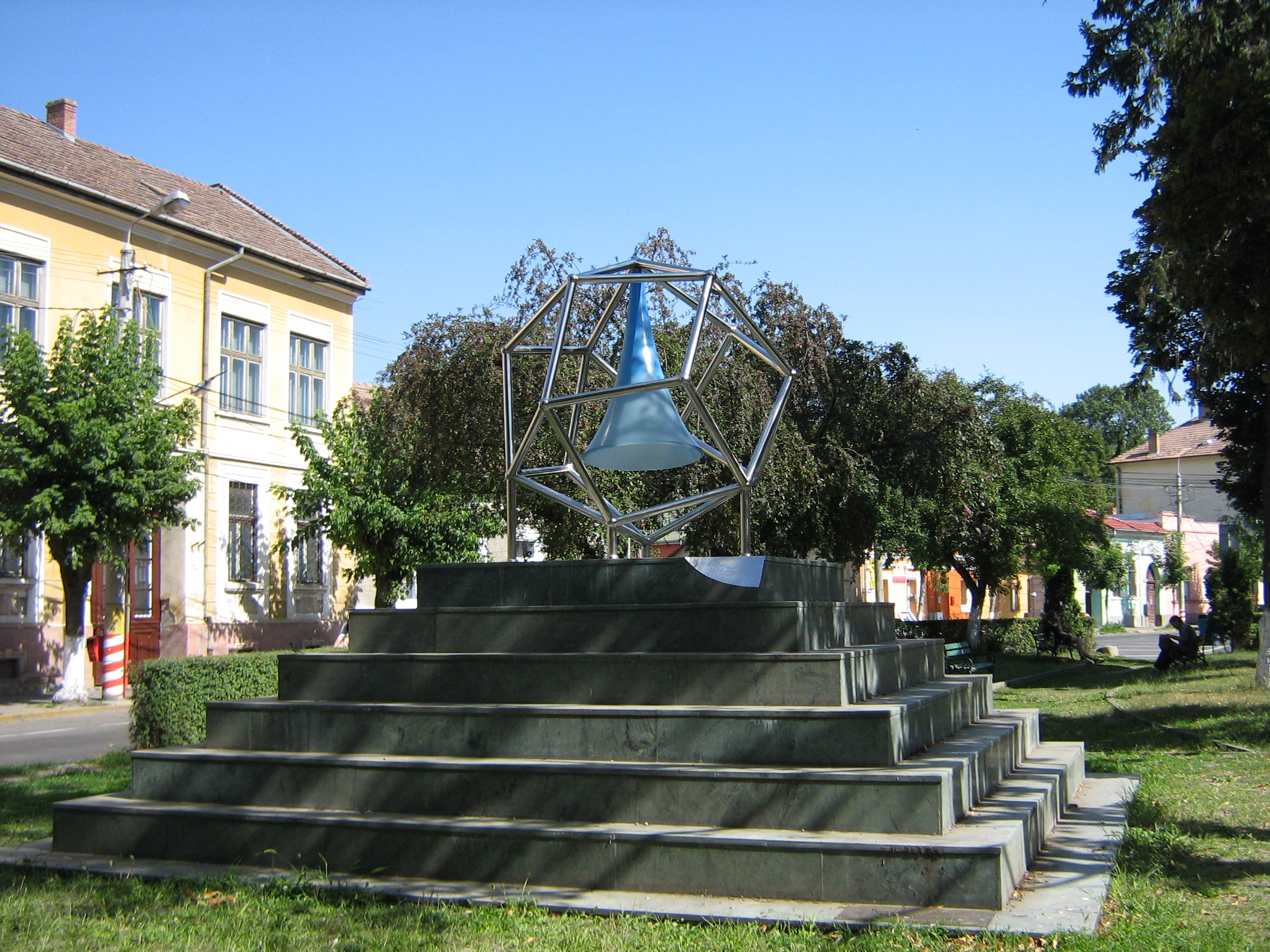
The Pseudosphere monument in Târgu Mureș

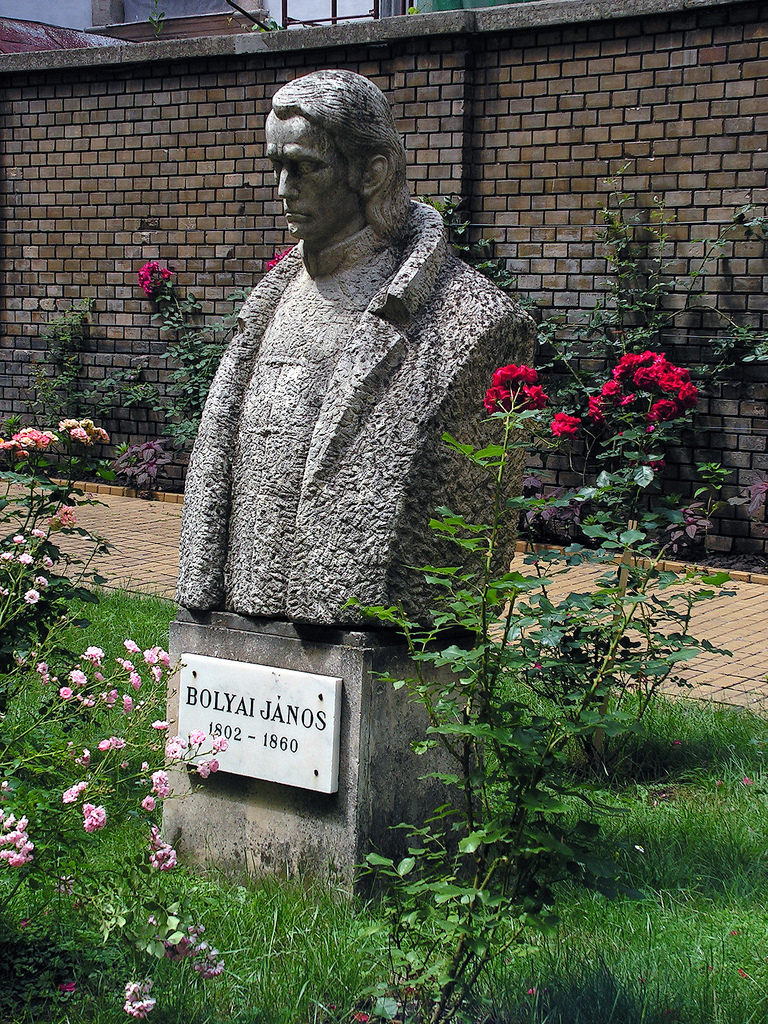
Bust of János Bolyai in Cluj-Napoca

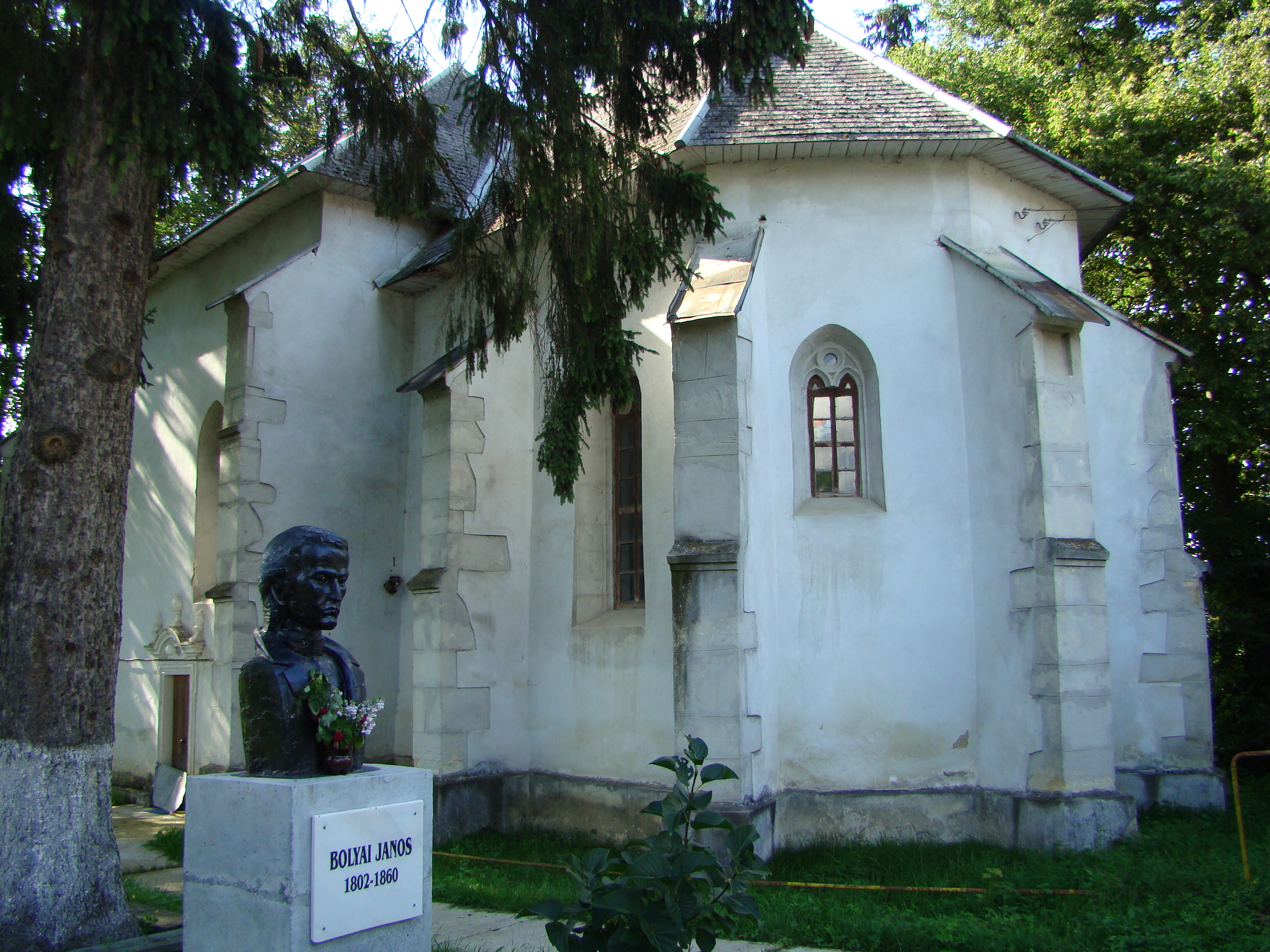
Bust of János Bolyai near the Reformed church in Nușeni, the home village of Farkas Bolyai's mother

== Works ==
- "Appendix scientiam spatii absolute veram exhibens; a veritate aut falsitate axiomatis XI Euclidei, a priori haud unquam", appendix to Farkas Bolyai, Tentamen juventutem studiosam in elementa matheseos purae, elementaris ac sublimioris, methodo intuitiva, evidentiaque huic propria, introducendi (An Attempt to Introduce Studious Youths to the Elements of Pure Mathematics), 1832.
  - English translation: "The Science Absolute of Space: Independent of the Truth or Falsity of Euclid's Axiom XI (Which Can Never Be Decided A Priori)", The Neomon, Austin, 1896.
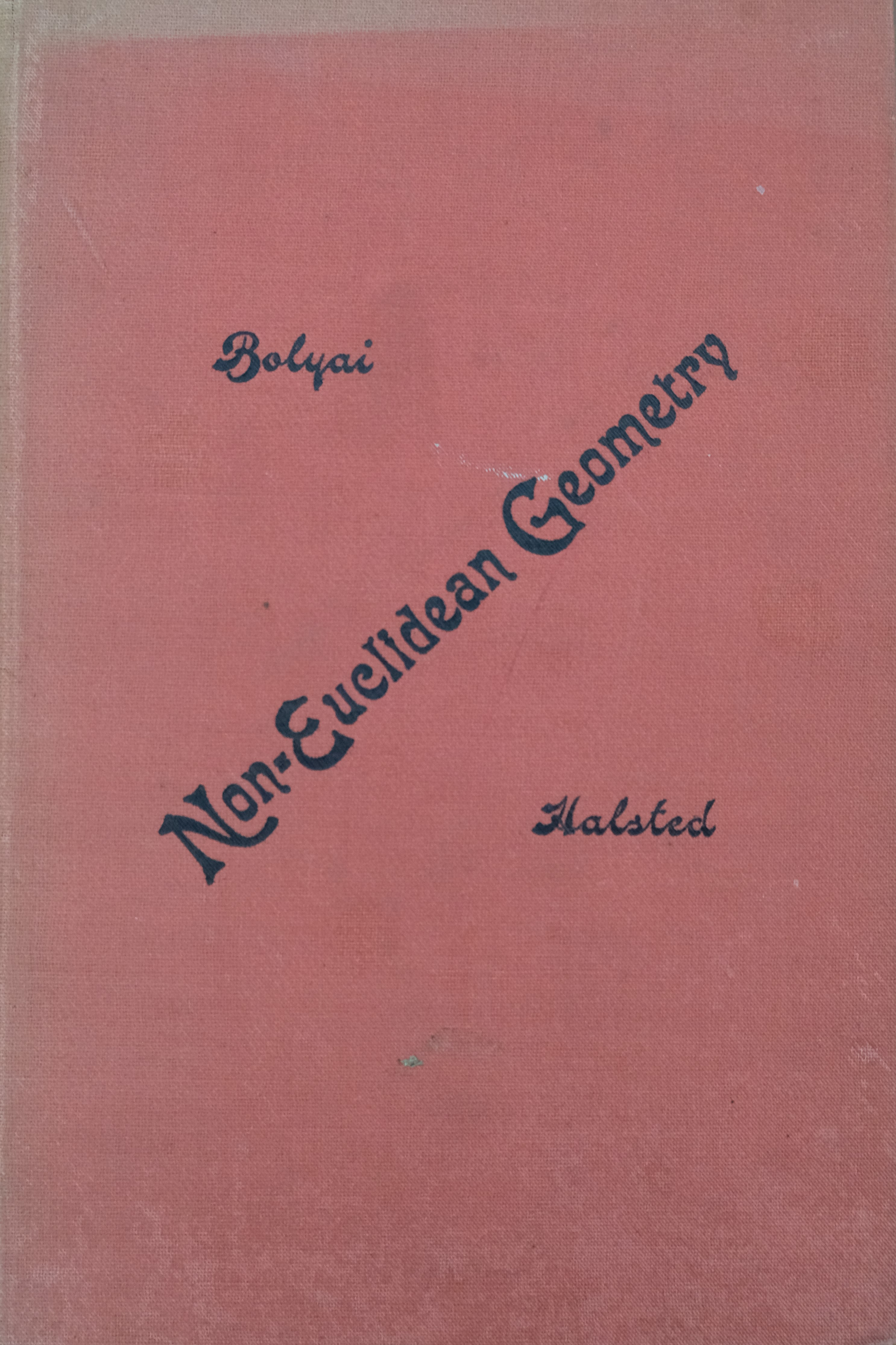
1896 copy of Bolyai's "The science absolute of space, independent of the truth or falsity of Euclid's axiom XI (which can never be decided a priori)"

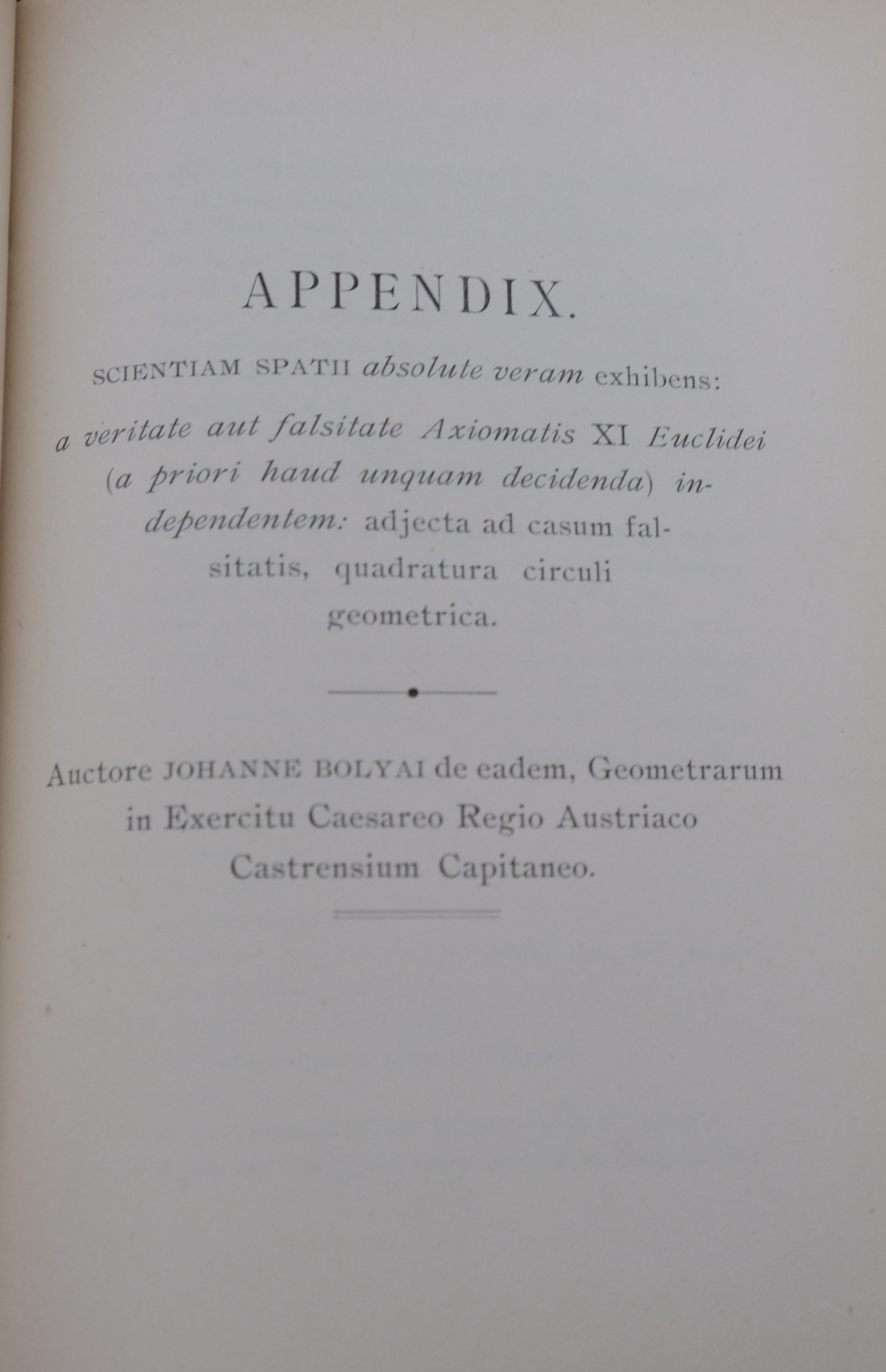
Appendix to "The science absolute of space"

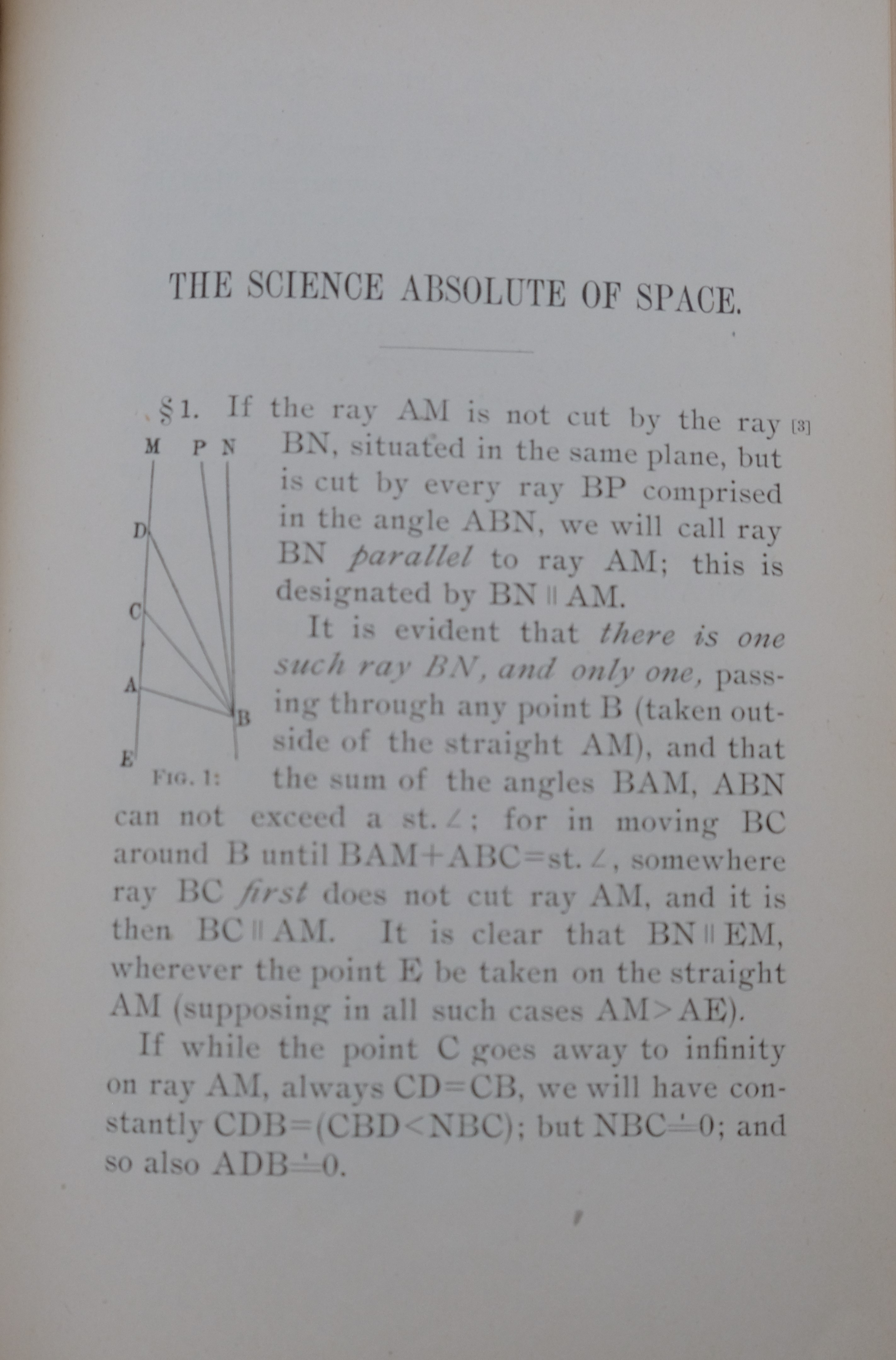
First page to "The science absolute of space"

== Sources ==
- Martin Gardner (2001) Non-Euclidean Geometry, Chapter 14 of The Colossal Book of Mathematics, W. W. Norton & Company ISBN 0-393-02023-1
- Jeremy Gray (2004) Janos Bolyai, Non-Euclidean Geometry, and the Nature of Space, MIT Press ISBN 0262571749
- Marvin Greenberg (2008) Euclidean and Non-Euclidean Geometries: Development and History, 4th edition, W. H. Freeman
- Elemér Kiss (1999) Mathematical Gems from the Bolyai Chests. János Bolyai's discoveries in number theory and algebra as recently deciphered from his manuscripts. Translated by Anikó Csirmaz and Gábor Oláh. Akadémiai Kiadó, Budapest; TypoTeX, Budapest, ISBN 963-05-7563-9;
- Tibor Weszely (2013) János Bolyai. Die ersten 200 Jahre, Birkhäuser, (translated from Hungarian by Manfred Stern), ISBN 978-3-0346-0046-0
- Ana Todea, Maria Fűllop, Monica Avram (2004) Oameni de știință mureșeni - Dicționar biobibliografic, CJ Mureș Biblioteca Județeană Mureș, tipografia Mediaprint SRL (in Romanian)
- Silva Oliva (2018) Janos Bolyai. Uno sguardo psicoanalitico su genio matematico e follia, ed Mimesis.
