= 2015 Canadian honours =

Canadian government recognitions

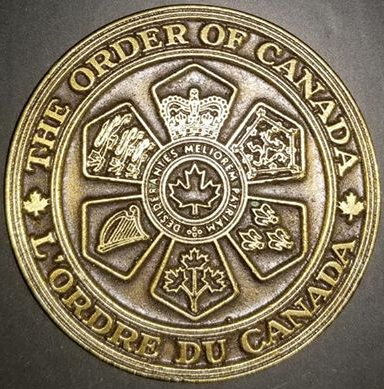
The Seal of the Order of Canada

The following are the appointments to various Canadian Honours of 2015. Usually, they are announced as part of the New Year and Canada Day celebrations and are published within the Canada Gazette during year. This follows the custom set out within the United Kingdom which publishes its appoints of various British Honours for New Year's and for monarch's official birthday. However, instead of the midyear appointments announced on Victoria Day, the official birthday of the Canadian Monarch, this custom has been transferred with the celebration of Canadian Confederation and the creation of the Order of Canada.

However, as the Canada Gazette publishes appointment to various orders, decorations and medal, either Canadian or from Commonwealth and foreign states, this article will reference all Canadians so honoured during the 2015 calendar year.

Provincial Honours are not listed within the Canada Gazette, however they are listed within the various publications of each provincial government. Provincial honours are listed within the page.

== The Order of Canada ==
=== Companions of the Order of Canada ===
Undress ribbon of a Companion of the Order of Canada

- James Douglas Fleck, C.C.
- Donald Malcolm McRae, C.C.
- Richard W. Pound, C.C., O.Q. - This is a promotion within the Order
- The Honourable Robert Keith Rae, P.C., C.C., O.Ont. - This is a promotion within the Order
- Janet Rossant, C.C.

=== Officer of the Order of Canada ===
Undress ribbon of an Officer of the Order of Canada

- Albert Bandura, O.C.
- The Honourable Jean-Louis Baudouin, O.C., G.O.Q.
- Mark Carney, O.C.
- Catherine Frazee, O.C.
- Shaf Keshavjee, O.C., O.Ont.
- Mark Lautens, O.C.
- Wendy Levinson, O.C.
- Norman Emilio Marcon, O.C.
- James Rodger Miller, O.C., S.O.M.
- The Honourable Peter Milliken, P.C., O.C.
- Julio Montaner, O.C., O.B.C.
- Nancy Margaret Reid, O.C.
- Eleanor Wachtel, O.C. - This is a promotion within the Order
- Sandra Black, O.C., O.Ont.
- Stephen Cook, O.C., O.Ont.
- Kenneth Denton Craig, O.C.
- Daniel J. Drucker, O.C.
- Mary Gospodarowicz Evans, O.C.
- Paul D. N. Hebert, O.C.
- The Honourable Allen Linden, O.C.
- Linda F. Nazar, O.C.
- The Honourable Louise Otis, O.C., O.Q.
- James Thomas Rutka, O.C., O.Ont.
- Stephen Toope, O.C.

=== Members of the Order of Canada ===
Undress ribbon for a Member of the Order of Canada

- Caroline Andrew, C.M.
- Jean-Pierre Andrieux, C.M.
- The Honourable Jacob Austin, P.C., C.M., O.B.C.
- Baidar Bakht, C.M.
- Denis Brott, C.M.
- Lisa Brown, C.M., M.S.M.
- Wally Buono, C.M.
- Peter Calamai, C.M.
- Christina Stuart Cameron, C.M.
- Wendy Marion Cecil, C.M.
- Brenda Clark, C.M.
- Robert Cecil Cole, C.M.
- Tim Cook, C.M.
- George Cope, C.M.
- Robert W. Cox, C.M.
- Alexander Gordon Craig, C.M.
- John W. Crichton, C.M.
- Conrad Charles Daellenbach, C.M.
- Patrick Dolan Darrah, C.M., O.N.B.
- Michael DeGagné, C.M., O.Ont.
- Jean-Guy Desjardins, C.M.
- Alba DiCenso, C.M.
- Edgar J. Dosman, C.M.
- Joanne M. Sullivan Douglas, C.M.
- Barry V. Downs, C.M.
- Louise Dupré, C.M.
- Simon Durivage, C.M.
- Kappy Flanders, C.M., M.S.M.
- Charles Foran, C.M.
- Julia E. Foster, C.M.
- Raymonde Gagné, C.M., O.M.
- Brenda Louise Gallie, C.M., O.Ont.
- Serge Gauthier, C.M.
- The Honourable Aurélien Gill, C.M., C.Q.
- James K. Gordon, C.M.
- The Honourable William C. Graham, P.C., C.M.
- John Grew, C.M.
- Christophe Guy, C.M., O.Q.
- Thomas Jon Harle, C.M., C.D.
- Frank Hasenfratz, C.M.
- Adèle M. Hurley, C.M.
- Joan F. Ivory, C.M.
- Patrick Johnston, C.M.
- John G. Kelton, C.M.
- Sheldon Kennedy, C.M.
- Laurence Klotz, C.M.
- Chantal Kreviazuk, C.M.
- Normand Laprise, C.M., C.Q.
- John Barker Lawson, C.M.
- Suzie LeBlanc, C.M.
- Grégoire Legendre, C.M.
- Jens Horst Lindemann, C.M.
- Keith MacLellan, C.M.
- Michael I. M. MacMillan, C.M.
- Raine Maida, C.M.
- Thomas J. Marrie, C.M.
- John G. McAvity, C.M.
- Susan McGrath, C.M.
- Jeremy Nichol McNeil, C.M.
- The Honourable Michael A. Meighen, C.M.
- Robert Mellin, C.M.
- Diane Morin, C.M.
- Russell J. Morrison, C.M.
- Peter Ernest Murdoch, C.M.
- Dan Needles, C.M.
- Cal Nichols, C.M.
- John Palmer, C.M.
- Charles E. Pascal, C.M.
- Michael Phillips, C.M.
- Ervin Podgorsak, C.M.
- John R. Porter, C.M., C.Q.
- Gary Slaight, C.M.
- H. Olav Slaymaker, C.M.
- Robyn Tamblyn, C.M.
- Jean-Claude Tardif, C.M.
- Lorraine Vaillancourt, C.M.
- Eric Robert Walters, C.M.
- H. Bruce Williams, C.M.
- Catherine Zahn, C.M.
- Ida Albo, C.M.
- Aubie Angel, C.M.
- Kenneth MacClure Baird, C.M.
- Pierre Bergeron, C.M.
- Daniel Bertolino, C.M.
- William A. Black, C.M.
- Nathalie Bondil, C.M., C.Q.
- Josiane Boulad-Ayoub, C.M.
- Beverley Boys, C.M.
- Blake Brooker, C.M.
- Bruce D. Campbell, C.M.
- Pat Capponi, C.M., O.Ont.
- Serge Chapleau, C.M.
- Martin Chernin, C.M.
- Wayne Suk Wing Chiu, C.M.
- John V. Cross, C.M., S.O.M.
- Jagannath Prasad Das, C.M.
- Lisa de Wilde, C.M.
- James F. Dinning, C.M.
- Madeleine Dion Stout, C.M.
- Elaine Dobbin, C.M.
- The Honourable Joyce Fairbairn, C.M.
- Michèle Fortin, C.M.
- Margaret Fountain, C.M.
- Douglas Edgar Fregin, C.M.
- Linda Gaboriau, C.M.
- David Roy Gillespie, C.M.
- Graham Greene, C.M.
- Yolande Grisé, C.M.
- Kathryn Jane Nightingale Hannah, C.M.
- Carolyn Hansson, C.M.
- Stewart Harris, C.M.
- Bill Henderson, C.M.
- Paul James Hill, C.M.
- Lawrence Hill, C.M.
- Leah Hollins, C.M.
- Mel Hoppenheim, C.M.
- Russ Howard, C.M., O.N.L.
- Sandra Irving, C.M.
- Jacques Israelievitch, C.M.
- Major Tetsuo Theodore Itani, C.M., O.M.M., C.D. (Ret'd)
- Monique Jérôme-Forget, C.M., O.Q.
- Donna Soble Kaufman, C.M.
- Frances Oldham Kelsey, C.M.
- Jay Keystone, C.M.
- Douglas Knight, C.M.
- Julia Koschitzky, C.M.
- Arthur Alexander Kube, C.M.
- Ginette Laurin, C.M.
- Ophelia Lazaridis, C.M.
- Marie-Nicole Lemieux, C.M., C.Q.
- Adeera Levin, C.M.
- H. Susan Lewis, C.M., O.M.
- J. Mark Lievonen, C.M.
- Judy Loman, C.M.
- Michel Louvain, C.M., C.Q.
- Christine Magee, C.M.
- Lynn McDonald, C.M.
- Jack Mintz, C.M.
- The Honourable John Wilson Morden, C.M.
- Fiona Nelson, C.M.
- Frank Newfeld, C.M.
- Anthony Phillips, C.M.
- Vivian Morris Rakoff, C.M.
- Mohamed Iqbal Ravalia, C.M.
- Garry L. Rempel, C.M.
- John Carman Ricker, C.M.
- Fran Rider, C.M.
- Lawrence Rossy, C.M., O.Q.
- Mary Rozsa de Coquet, C.M.
- Hubert Sacy, C.M., C.Q.
- Sandra Scarth, C.M.
- Bonnie Schmidt, C.M.
- Barbara Kristina Schmidt, C.M.
- François Schubert, C.M.
- Marla Shapiro, C.M.
- Susan Sherwin, C.M.
- E. Leigh Syms, C.M.
- Don Tapscott, C.M.
- Serge Patrice Thibodeau, C.M.
- Morley Torgov, C.M.
- Barbara Turnbull, C.M.
- V. Prem Watsa, C.M.
- Carolyn Ruth Wilson, C.M.
- Martin Yaffe, C.M.
- Phyllis Yaffe, C.M.

== Order of Military Merit ==
=== Termination of an appointment within the Order of Military Merit ===
- Lieutenant-Colonel Deborah Miller, C.D.

=== Commanders of the Order of Military Merit ===
Undress ribbon for a Commander of the Order of Military Merit

- Lieutenant-General Michael Day, C.M.M., M.S.C., C.D. - This is a promotion within the Order
- Rear-Admiral Joseph Edward Thomas Peter Ellis, C.M.M., C.D.
- Rear-Admiral Patrick Terence Finn, C.M.M., C.D. - This is a promotion within the Order
- Major-General Dean James Milner, C.M.M., M.S.C., C.D. - This is a promotion within the Order
- Major-General Pierre St-Amand, C.M.M., C.D. - This is a promotion within the Order

=== Officers of the Order of Military Merit ===
Undress ribbon for an Officer of the Order of Military Merit

- Lieutenant-Colonel Eleonora Maria Agnew, O.M.M., C.D.
- Lieutenant-Colonel Joseph Michel Steve Boivin, O.M.M., M.S.M., C.D.
- Captain(N) Luc Cassivi, O.M.M., C.D.
- Colonel Grant Fernand Dame, O.M.M., M.S.M., C.D.
- Colonel Joseph Serge Steve Dany Fortin, O.M.M., C.D.
- Colonel Blaise Francis Frawley, O.M.M., C.D.
- Major Michael Hans Groh, O.M.M., C.D.
- Lieutenant-Colonel Steven Leslie Hart, O.M.M., C.D.
- Colonel Kerry William Horlock, O.M.M., M.S.M., C.D.
- Lieutenant-Colonel Mark Bradley Larsen, O.M.M., C.D.
- Major Rickey Maxwell Lewis, O.M.M., C.D.
- Colonel Hugh Colin Mackay, O.M.M., C.D.
- Brigadier-General Rob Roy Everett MacKenzie, O.M.M., C.D.
- Colonel Russell Barry Mann, O.M.M., C.D.
- Lieutenant-Colonel James Andrew Peck, O.M.M., C.D.
- Commander Patricia Lee Roberts, O.M.M., C.D.
- Colonel Joseph Albert Donald Rousseau, O.M.M., C.D.
- Colonel Marie Céline Danielle Savard, O.M.M., M.S.M., C.D.
- Commander Sandra Maria Sukstorf, O.M.M., C.D.
- Captain(N) Stephen Alexander Virgin, O.M.M., M.S.M., C.D.
- Colonel David Ross Weger, O.M.M., C.D.
- Colonel Terrence Leroy Wood, O.M.M., C.D.

=== Members of the Order of Military Merit ===
Undress ribbon for a Member of the Order of Military Merit

- Captain Timothy David Aldridge, M.M.M., C.D.
- Master Warrant Officer Donald Earl Askeland, M.M.M., C.D.
- Sergeant Nicole Lynn Barrett, M.M.M., C.D.
- Warrant Officer Dana Beverly Beattie, M.M.M., C.D.
- Master Warrant Officer Ian Ronald Jude Bennett, M.M.M., C.D.
- Chief Petty Officer 2nd Class Brent Garrett Bethell, M.M.M., C.D.
- Warrant Officer David Carman Bibby, M.M.M., C.D.
- Chief Petty Officer 1st Class Joseph Fernand Sylvain Bolduc, M.M.M., C.D.
- Chief Warrant Officer Joseph Lauredan Daniel Brissette, M.M.M., M.S.M., C.D.
- Master Warrant Officer Daniel Andrew Campbell, M.M.M., C.D.
- Warrant Officer Steve Martin Caron, M.M.M., C.D.
- Chief Petty Officer 2nd Class Marie-Josée Chapleau, M.M.M., C.D.
- Chief Warrant Officer Joseph Charles Philippe Chevalier, M.M.M., C.D.
- Master Warrant Officer John Castel Copeland, M.M.M., C.D.
- Sergeant Steven Dunley Dacey, M.M.M., C.D.
- Chief Warrant Officer Claude Dallaire, M.M.M., M.S.M., C.D.
- Master Warrant Officer Marnie Davis, M.M.M., C.D.
- Warrant Officer Stephen Michael Dawe, M.M.M., C.D.
- Master Warrant Officer Joseph Gilbert Alain Denis Delisle, M.M.M., C.D.
- Warrant Officer Brenda Lee Di Bartolo, M.M.M., C.D.
- Master Warrant Officer Paul André Christian Doucet, M.M.M., C.D.
- Master Warrant Officer Joseph Georges André Dugal, M.M.M., C.D.
- Sub-Lieutenant Michèle Dumaresq-Ouellet, M.M.M., M.S.M., C.D.
- Warrant Officer Richard Fancy, M.M.M., C.D.
- Chief Petty Officer 1st Class Paul Andrew Fenton, M.M.M., C.D.
- Sergeant Timothy Ferguson, M.M.M., C.D.
- Major Erica Leigh Fleck, M.M.M., C.D.
- Master Warrant Officer Joseph Lucien Steve Fréchette, M.M.M., C.D.
- Chief Warrant Officer Joseph Gérard Marc Gabanna, M.M.M., C.D.
- Master Warrant Officer Clermont Gagné, M.M.M., C.D.
- Major Stephen Foster Gallagher, M.M.M., C.D.
- Major George Charles Garrard, M.M.M., C.D.
- Chief Warrant Officer Joseph Dominic Stéphane Gaudreau, M.M.M., C.D.
- Master Warrant Officer Joseph Claude Dominique Geoffroy, M.M.M., C.D.
- Chief Warrant Officer Joseph Gerard René Gilbert, M.M.M., C.D.
- Chief Warrant Officer Joseph Guy Bruno Claude Gilbert, M.M.M., C.D.
- Sergeant Rachel Girard, M.M.M., C.D.
- Chief Warrant Officer Joseph Alexander Marcel Stephan Goupil, M.M.M., C.D.
- Major Douglas Shawn Patrick Groves, M.M.M., C.D.
- Captain Marie Janick Nancy Guérin, M.M.M., C.D.
- Master Warrant Officer William John Hall, M.M.M., C.D.
- Chief Warrant Officer Colleen Ann Halpin, M.M.M., C.D.
- Master Warrant Officer Crystal Lynn Harris, M.M.M., C.D.
- Chief Warrant Officer Mitchell Hepburn, M.M.M., C.D.
- Master Warrant Officer David Edward Hepditch, M.M.M., C.D.
- Warrant Officer Daniel James Holley, M.M.M., C.D.
- Warrant Officer Marie Doris Diane Jalbert, M.M.M., C.D.
- Chief Petty Officer 2nd Class Cyrus Jawahar John, M.M.M., C.D.
- Chief Petty Officer 1st Class Ian Mark Kelly, M.M.M., C.D.
- Captain Joseph Ghislain Lévesque, M.M.M., C.D.
- Chief Warrant Officer Joseph Robert Guy Stéphane Marcoux, M.M.M., C.D.
- Chief Warrant Officer James Gordon Scott Marshall, M.M.M., C.D.
- Captain Malcolm Alastair McMurachy, M.M.M., C.D.
- Master Warrant Officer John Robert McNabb, M.M.M., M.S.C. C.D.
- Chief Petty Officer 2nd Class Richard John Meredith, M.M.M., C.D.
- Master Warrant Officer David Elwell Milligan, M.M.M., M.S.M., C.D.
- Chief Warrant Officer Richard Philias Roger Nadeau, M.M.M., C.D.
- Private Thomas Nickel, M.M.M., C.D.
- Lieutenant(N) Heather Marlene Oake, M.M.M., C.D.
- Master Warrant Officer Joseph Gilles Alain Oligny, M.M.M., C.D.
- Chief Warrant Officer Ambrose Penton, M.M.M., M.S.M., C.D.
- Chief Petty Officer 2nd Class Danny Peppar, M.M.M., C.D.
- Captain Michael Grayer Perkins, M.M.M., C.D.
- Warrant Officer Steven Hugh Edward Price, M.M.M., C.D.
- Chief Warrant Officer Joseph André Michel Provencher, M.M.M., C.D.
- Warrant Officer Kimberly Christine Pyke, M.M.M., C.D.
- Chief Warrant Officer Eric John Rolfe, M.M.M., M.S.M., C.D.
- Warrant Officer Scott Vernon Russell, M.M.M., C.D.
- Warrant Officer Steven Wade Rutt, M.M.M., C.D.
- Chief Warrant Officer Joseph Steeve Yancy Savard, M.M.M., C.D.
- Warrant Officer Lawrence Jeffrey Schnurr, M.M.M., C.D.
- Master Warrant Officer David George Shultz, M.M.M., S.M.V., C.D.
- Petty Officer 1st Class Philip Wade Smith, M.M.M., C.D.
- Chief Petty Officer 2nd Class Eric Wilfred Stone, M.M.M., C.D.
- Warrant Officer Michael David Swinimer, M.M.M., C.D.
- Warrant Officer Jason Tomlinson, M.M.M., C.D.
- Chief Warrant Officer Robert Richard Viel, M.M.M., C.D.
- Petty Officer 2nd Class Tara Lee White, M.M.M., C.D.
- Chief Warrant Officer Martin Woods, M.M.M., C.D.
- Major Darcy James Wright, M.M.M., C.D.
- Chief Petty Officer 2nd Class Kelly Allan Yerama, M.M.M., C.D.

== Order of Merit of the Police Forces ==
=== Commander of the Order of Merit of the Police Forces ===
Undress ribbon of a Commander of the Order of Merit of the Police Forces

- Chief Constable James Chu, C.O.M. - This is a promotion within the Order

=== Officers of the Order of Merit of the Police Forces ===
Undress ribbon of an Officer of the Order of Merit of the Police Forces

- Deputy Chief Roger Dean Chaffin, O.O.M.
- Chief Glenn De Caire, O.O.M. - This is a promotion within the Order
- Deputy Chief Michael Federico, O.O.M. - This is a promotion within the Order
- Assistant Commissioner Tracy L. Hardy, O.O.M.
- Chief Douglas Eric Jolliffe, O.O.M. - This is a promotion within the Order
- Assistant Commissioner James Malizia, O.O.M.
- Deputy Chief Mark Saunders, O.O.M.
- Deputy Chief Peter J. M. Sloly, O.O.M. - This is a promotion within the Order

=== Members of the Order of Merit of the Police Forces ===
Undress ribbon of a Member of the Order of Merit of the Police Forces

- Sergeant Dean Aitken, M.O.M.
- Sergeant Dean Aitken, M.O.M.
- Superintendent David Benton Attfield, M.O.M.
- Sergeant Robert Bernier, M.O.M.
- Chief Superintendent Fred Bertucca, M.O.M.
- Staff Sergeant Galib Bhayani, M.O.M.
- Inspector Carole Bird, M.O.M.
- Director Serge Boulerice, M.O.M.
- Chief Richard M. Bourassa, M.O.M.
- Staff Sergeant Jacques Brassard, M.O.M.
- Assistant Commissioner Brenda Butterworth-Carr, M.O.M.
- Superintendent Donald A. Campbell, M.O.M.
- Superintendent Claude Castonguay, M.O.M.
- Chief Superintendent F. G. Peter Clark, M.O.M.
- Chief Superintendent Gaétan Courchesne, M.O.M.
- Chief Superintendent Charles E. Cox, M.O.M.
- Chief Dale Cox, M.O.M.
- Superintendent Joanne Grace Crampton, M.O.M.
- Superintendent Leonard Rodney Gelindo Del Pino, M.O.M.
- Director Helen M. R. H. Dion, M.O.M.
- Superintendent Brendan R. Fitzpatrick, M.O.M.
- Chief Albert T. Frederick, M.O.M.
- Chief Superintendent Wayne Gerard Gallant, M.O.M.
- Staff Sergeant Darrell R. Gaudet, M.O.M.
- Detective Inspector Christine A. Gilpin, M.O.M.
- Superintendent R. Graham Gleason, M.O.M.
- Staff Sergeant John W. Goodman, M.O.M.
- Staff Sergeant Isobel Granger, M.O.M.
- Chief Ian Robert Grant, M.O.M.
- Constable Arnold F. Guerin, M.O.M.
- Deputy Chief Anthony John Harder, M.O.M.
- Superintendent Peter W. G. M. Haring, M.O.M.
- Sergeant Philip H. Hasenpflug, M.O.M.
- Staff Sergeant Lindsay E. Hernden, M.O.M.
- Sergeant Stephen F. Hicks, M.O.M.
- Mr. Gary A. Holden, M.O.M.
- Deputy Chief Constable Steven Herbert Ing, M.O.M.
- Chief Inspector Daniel Jacques, M.O.M.
- Chief Darrell L. Kambeitz, M.O.M.
- Detective Inspector Andrew Michael Karski, M.O.M.
- Staff Sergeant Matthew Kavanagh, M.O.M.
- Assistant Commissioner Louise Lafrance, M.O.M.
- Captain Dominique Lafrenière, M.O.M.
- Superintendent Serge Lalonde, M.O.M.
- Chief Inspector Panagiotis Lambrinakos, M.O.M.
- Chief John Leontowicz, M.O.M.
- Deputy Chief Joseph James Matthews, M.O.M.
- Deputy Chief Christopher McCord, M.O.M.
- Constable Michael McCormack, M.O.M.
- Superintendent Kenneth Dwayne McDonald, M.O.M.
- Superintendent Robin McElary-Downer, M.O.M.
- Inspector Dennis McGuffin, M.O.M.
- Deputy Chief Antje B. McNeely, M.O.M.
- Assistant Commissioner Gilles Joseph Robert Moreau, M.O.M.
- Staff Sergeant Paul Allan Mulvihill, M.O.M.
- Inspector Robert Joseph Page, M.O.M.
- Deputy Chief John B. Pare, M.O.M.
- Chief Paul E. Pedersen, M.O.M.
- Assistant Commissioner Pierre Perron, M.O.M.
- Chief Superintendent Guy J. Pilon, M.O.M.
- Inspector Christopher Renwick, M.O.M.
- Deputy Chief J. Daniel Rioux, M.O.M.
- Staff Sergeant Michael S. Savage, M.O.M.
- Sergeant David Marc Searle, M.O.M.
- Inspector Roderick Kenneth Shaw, M.O.M.
- Assistant Commissioner Todd Shean, M.O.M.
- Assistant Commissioner Dale Sheehan, M.O.M.
- Ms. Verona Singer, M.O.M.
- Sergeant Craig Marshall Smith, M.O.M.
- Chief Superintendent Marlene Rose Snowman, M.O.M.
- Sergeant Jeff Robert Swann, M.O.M.
- Assistant Commissioner Marc Tardif, M.O.M.
- Detective Superintendent David D. J. Truax, M.O.M.
- Patrol Sergeant Edith H. Turner, M.O.M.
- Staff Sergeant James L. Vardy, M.O.M.
- Assistant Commissioner Stephen Edward White, M.O.M.
- Superintendent Daryl Wiebe, M.O.M.
- Inspector Catherine Ann Yeandle-Slater, M.O.M.
- Superintendent Andris Zarins, M.O.M.Superintendent David Benton Attfield, M.O.M.
- Sergeant Robert Bernier, M.O.M.
- Chief Superintendent Fred Bertucca, M.O.M.
- Staff Sergeant Galib Bhayani, M.O.M.
- Inspector Carole Bird, M.O.M.
- Director Serge Boulerice, M.O.M.
- Chief Richard M. Bourassa, M.O.M.
- Staff Sergeant Jacques Brassard, M.O.M.
- Assistant Commissioner Brenda Butterworth-Carr, M.O.M.
- Superintendent Donald A. Campbell, M.O.M.
- Superintendent Claude Castonguay, M.O.M.
- Chief Superintendent F. G. Peter Clark, M.O.M.
- Chief Superintendent Gaétan Courchesne, M.O.M.
- Chief Superintendent Charles E. Cox, M.O.M.
- Chief Dale Cox, M.O.M.
- Superintendent Joanne Grace Crampton, M.O.M.
- Superintendent Leonard Rodney Gelindo Del Pino, M.O.M.
- Director Helen M. R. H. Dion, M.O.M.
- Superintendent Brendan R. Fitzpatrick, M.O.M.
- Chief Albert T. Frederick, M.O.M.
- Chief Superintendent Wayne Gerard Gallant, M.O.M.
- Staff Sergeant Darrell R. Gaudet, M.O.M.
- Detective Inspector Christine A. Gilpin, M.O.M.
- Superintendent R. Graham Gleason, M.O.M.
- Staff Sergeant John W. Goodman, M.O.M.
- Staff Sergeant Isobel Granger, M.O.M.
- Chief Ian Robert Grant, M.O.M.
- Constable Arnold F. Guerin, M.O.M.
- Deputy Chief Anthony John Harder, M.O.M.
- Superintendent Peter W. G. M. Haring, M.O.M.
- Sergeant Philip H. Hasenpflug, M.O.M.
- Staff Sergeant Lindsay E. Hernden, M.O.M.
- Sergeant Stephen F. Hicks, M.O.M.
- Mr. Gary A. Holden, M.O.M.
- Deputy Chief Constable Steven Herbert Ing, M.O.M.
- Chief Inspector Daniel Jacques, M.O.M.
- Chief Darrell L. Kambeitz, M.O.M.
- Detective Inspector Andrew Michael Karski, M.O.M.
- Staff Sergeant Matthew Kavanagh, M.O.M.
- Assistant Commissioner Louise Lafrance, M.O.M.
- Captain Dominique Lafrenière, M.O.M.
- Superintendent Serge Lalonde, M.O.M.
- Chief Inspector Panagiotis Lambrinakos, M.O.M.
- Chief John Leontowicz, M.O.M.
- Deputy Chief Joseph James Matthews, M.O.M.
- Deputy Chief Christopher McCord, M.O.M.
- Constable Michael McCormack, M.O.M.
- Superintendent Kenneth Dwayne McDonald, M.O.M.
- Superintendent Robin McElary-Downer, M.O.M.
- Inspector Dennis McGuffin, M.O.M.
- Deputy Chief Antje B. McNeely, M.O.M.
- Assistant Commissioner Gilles Joseph Robert Moreau, M.O.M.
- Staff Sergeant Paul Allan Mulvihill, M.O.M.
- Inspector Robert Joseph Page, M.O.M.
- Deputy Chief John B. Pare, M.O.M.
- Chief Paul E. Pedersen, M.O.M.
- Assistant Commissioner Pierre Perron, M.O.M.
- Chief Superintendent Guy J. Pilon, M.O.M.
- Inspector Christopher Renwick, M.O.M.
- Deputy Chief J. Daniel Rioux, M.O.M.
- Staff Sergeant Michael S. Savage, M.O.M.
- Sergeant David Marc Searle, M.O.M.
- Inspector Roderick Kenneth Shaw, M.O.M.
- Assistant Commissioner Todd Shean, M.O.M.
- Assistant Commissioner Dale Sheehan, M.O.M.
- Ms. Verona Singer, M.O.M.
- Sergeant Craig Marshall Smith, M.O.M.
- Chief Superintendent Marlene Rose Snowman, M.O.M.
- Sergeant Jeff Robert Swann, M.O.M.
- Assistant Commissioner Marc Tardif, M.O.M.
- Detective Superintendent David D. J. Truax, M.O.M.
- Patrol Sergeant Edith H. Turner, M.O.M.
- Staff Sergeant James L. Vardy, M.O.M.
- Assistant Commissioner Stephen Edward White, M.O.M.
- Superintendent Daryl Wiebe, M.O.M.
- Inspector Catherine Ann Yeandle-Slater, M.O.M.
- Superintendent Andris Zarins, M.O.M.

== Royal Victorian Order ==
Undress ribbon for all grades of the Royal Victorian Order

=== Commander of the Royal Victorian Order ===
- The Honourable Hilary M. Weston, C.M., O.Ont.

=== Member of the Royal Victorian Order ===
- Craig Lennard Kowalik

== Most Venerable Order of the Hospital of St. John of Jerusalem ==
Undress ribbon for all grades of the Most Venerable Order of the Hospital of St. John of Jerusalem

=== Knights and Dames of the Order of St. John ===
- John Wesley Cosman, NB
- Her Honour the Honourable Elizabeth Dowdeswell, O.C., O.Ont., ON
- André Levesque, O.M.M., C.D., PE
- Kenneth Ross Turriff, ON

=== Commanders of the Order of St. John ===
- Brian Allan Kinaschuk, ON
- Major Victor Knowlton, C.D., QC
- Alan McBride, ON
- Carolyn Frances Rothenburger (née Trost), SK
- Captain Samuel Wenzel Billich, C.D., ON
- Leslie Helen Jack, ON
- Brigadier-General (Retired) Stanley Gordon Johnstone, C.D., ON
- Alain Louis Joseph Laurencelle, MB
- Donald Sherwood, NB

=== Officers of the Order of St. John ===
- David Clifton Bean, NB
- Taramay Curtis, AB
- Armand Paul La Barge, ON
- Jean-Philippe Lebel, QC
- Gerald William McEwin, ON
- Ian Hugh Miller, ON
- James Douglas Tooke, ON
- Donald Raymond Wilson, NB
- Captain Peter Beatty, C.D., ON
- Warrant Officer Andrew Shawn Daring, AB
- Susan Beth Davis, NL
- Stéphane Gignac, QC
- Larry James Jeider, BC
- Travis Ryan Lanoway, AB
- Angeline Pleunis, ON

=== Members of the Order of St. John ===
- Lieutenant-Colonel Richard Frank Bialachowski, C.D., ON
- Joanne Margaret Biggs, ON
- Officer Cadet Jason Bond, NS
- Steven Bradley, NS
- Captain Stephen Brosha, NS
- Lisa Danielle Burke, NS
- William Thomas Cahill, NL
- Joel Campbell, ON
- Lieutenant-Colonel Frances Louise Chilton-Mackay, O.M.M., M.S.M., C.D., ON
- Dirk Alexander Chisholm, AB
- Philip Peter Dawson, ON
- James Donohue, NS
- Thomas Barry Kevin Ferguson, C.D., ON
- Manon Gauthier, QC
- Major (Retired) Paul Henry, C.D., ON
- Jean Claude Latour, NS
- Master Corporal Richard Herve Joseph Le Coz, ON
- Tamara Lynne MacDuff, NS
- Daniel Charles Maher, NL
- Carney De Berri Matheson, ON
- Lieutenant-Colonel (Retired) Michael David McKay, C.D., ON
- Pedrom Nasiri, AB
- Gerrard Austin Nudds, ON
- Jason Nurse, ON
- Nancy Elizabeth Page, ON
- Major Michael Andrew Rehill, C.D., ON
- Gail Colleen Rogers, ON
- Beverly Segal, ON
- Dean William Smith, AB
- Gerry Stamp, NL
- Jeannette Tinsley, ON
- Ahmad Sulaiman Aini, MB
- Major Harvey Roy Bailey, C.D., ON
- Ally Wai Ying Chan Chin, BC
- Deborah Cooke, ON
- Major Patrick Thomas Crocco, ON
- Catherine Mary Crowther, BC
- Joy Dockrey, BC
- Jonathan Mathew Craig Farrell-Griffin, ON
- Glenda Mary Janes, NL
- Rebecca Anne Johnston, ON
- Christopher Kirec, ON
- Winnie Wing-May Lai, BC
- Jeffrey Lavigne, ON
- John Mario Norbert Lemieux, QC
- Jessica Elizabeth Lezen, MB
- Harold Joseph MacKinnon, ON
- Sanny Sum Yee Marr, BC
- Angela Corinne Martin, NL
- Lieutenant-Colonel Raymond Charles McGill, ON
- Kevin Moore, SK
- Kathy Ross, QC
- Captain Jean-Pascal Roy, C.D., QC
- Glen William Rutland, NT
- Lynn Ann Telo, ON
- Lieutenant-Commander (Retired) John Frederick Trigg, BC
- Raymond David Valentine, C.D., BC
- Kristen Johanna Brearley Van Esch, BC
- Karen Frances Walker, ON
- Martin William Wong, BC
- Yu Hin Jackson Wu, BC
- Wilson King Kai Yeung, BC

== Provincial Honours ==
=== National Order of Québec ===
==== Grand Officers of the National Order of Québec ====
Undress ribbon for a Grand Officer of the National Order of Québec

- Denys Arcand, G.O.Q
- Michel Tremblay, G.O.Q

==== Honorary Grand Officer ====
- François Hollande, G.O.Q

==== Officers of the National Order of Québec ====
Undress ribbon for an Officer of the National Order of Québec

- Marcel Barbeau, O.Q
- Jean Bissonnette, O.Q
- François-Marc Gagnon, O.Q
- Madeleine Gagnon, O.Q
- Lise Gauvin, O.Q
- Paul Inchauspé, O.Q
- Joanne Liu, O.Q
- Pierre A. Michaud, O.Q
- Yannick Nézet-Séguin, O.Q
- Jean Rochon, O.Q
- Jean-Louis Roy, O.Q
- Céline Saint-Pierre, O.Q
- Réjean Thomas, O.Q

==== Honorary officers ====
- Zila Bernd, O.Q
- Alain Fuchs, O.Q
- Gérard Collomb, O.Q
- Benoîte Groult, O.Q
- Paul Tréguer, O.Q

==== Knight of the National Order of Québec ====
Undress ribbon for a Knight of the National Order of Québec

- Henri Brun, C.Q
- Diane Chênevert, C.Q
- Marie Chouinard, C.Q
- Michel Côté, C.Q
- Michel Dallaire, C.Q
- Jean-Pierre Després, C.Q
- André Dubois, C.Q
- Ray-Marc Dumoulin, C.Q
- Marcel Fournier, C.Q
- Guy Gervais, C.Q
- Paul Grand’Maison, C.Q
- Marc Laurendeau, C.Q
- Alain Lemaire, C.Q
- Laurent Lemaire, C.Q
- Marina Orsini, C.Q
- Patrick Pichette, C.Q
- Francine Ruest Jutras, C.Q
- Alain Simard, C.Q
- Kim Thuy, C.Q
- Michel L. Tremblay, C.Q

==== Honorary Members ====
- Fernando Cupertino de Barros, C.Q
- Yves Tavernier, C.Q
- Myrna Delson Karan, C.Q
- Jean-Luc Alimondo, C.Q
- Fatimata Dia, C.Q
- Mark Kenber, C.Q
- Noel Lateef, C.Q

=== Saskatchewan Order of Merit ===
Undress ribbon for a member of the Saskatchewan Order of Merit

- Jack Brodsky, S.O.M.
- The Reverend Lorne Calvert, S.O.M.
- Dr. Wilfred (Wilf) Keller, S.O.M.
- The Honourable William (Bill) McKnight, P.C., S.O.M., LL.D.
- Yvette Moore, S.O.M.
- Maestro Victor Sawa, S.O.M.
- Ellen Schmeiser, S.O.M., Q.C.
- Dr. David E. Smith, O.C., S.O.M., F.R.S.C.
- Henry Woolf, S.O.M., LL.D

=== Order of Ontario ===
Undress ribbon for a member of the Order of Ontario

- Peter A. Adamson – Surgical Specialist in Otolaryngology
- Mehran Anvari – Surgical Robotics Pioneer
- Donovan Bailey – Track and Field Icon
- Jennifer Bond – Professor of Law and Human Rights Advocate
- Angèle Brunelle – Advocate for Northwest Ontario's Francophone Community
- Ronald F. Caza – Lawyer and Defender of Francophone Linguistic Rights
- Anthony Kam Chuen Chan – Pediatric Hematologist and Scientist
- Ethel Côté – Entrepreneur, Volunteer and Community leader
- Jim Estill – Entrepreneur and Philanthropist
- Carol Finlay – Anglican Priest and Education Advocate
- Cheryl Forchuk – Scholar in the Fields of Homelessness, Poverty and Mental Health
- Dorothée Gizenga – International Development Expert and Human Rights Advocate
- Shirley Greenberg – Lawyer and Women's Rights Advocate
- Robert Pio Hajjar – Motivational Speaker
- Greta Hodgkinson – Prima Ballerina
- Dorothy Anna Jarvis – Pediatrician
- Lisa LaFlamme – Broadcast Journalist
- M.G. Venkatesh Mannar – Expert in Food Science Technologies and Nutrition
- Ernest Matton (Little Brown Bear) – Community Capacity Builder and Spiritual Ambassador
- Dennis O'Connor – former Associate Chief Justice of Ontario
- David Pearson – Professor and Promoter of Science Communication
- Fran Rider – Women's Hockey Advocate
- Beverley Salmon – Anti-Racism and Community Activist
- Hugh Segal – Public Servant
- Helga Stephenson – Arts Administrator and Human Rights Activist
- Margo Timmins – Vocalist

=== Order of British Columbia ===
Undress ribbon for a member of the Order of British Columbia

- Lorne R. Segal (2014)
- Barry Lapointe
- Chief Robert Joseph
- Al B. Etmanski
- Kerry Dennehy
- Tim Collings
- Dr. Ron Burnett
- Don R. Lindsay (2014)
- Jim Shepard
- Sing Lim Yeo
- Dr. Saida Rasul
- Rudolph North (2014)
- Wendy Lisogar-Cocchia
- Ginny Dennehy
- Jane Dyson
- Norman Rolston
- Hari Varshney
- Tamara Taggart
- Melvin Zajac

=== Alberta Order of Excellence ===
Undress ribbon for a member of the Alberta Order of Excellence

- David Bissett
- Jack Donald
- Dennis Erker
- Janice Eisenhauer
- Fil Fraser (deceased)
- Stan Grad
- Jacob Masliyah
- Frits Pannekoek

=== Order of Prince Edward Island ===
Undress ribbon for a member of the Order of Prince Edward Island

- J.W. (Bill) Campbell
- Gerald Sheldon Dixon
- Dr. Charles St. Clair Trainor

=== Order of Manitoba ===
Undress ribbon for a member of the Order of Manitoba

- Rachel Oyenihun Alao
- Chad Allan
- Karen Beaudin
- Tom Cochrane
- Dian Nusgart Cohen
- Wilma L. Derksen
- Daniel George Johnson
- Sheldon Kennedy
- Donald R. J. Mackey
- Mitch Podolak
- Monica Kkhem Kamarie Singh
- Jonathan Toews

=== Order of New Brunswick ===
Undress ribbon for a member of the Order of New Brunswick

- Camille Normand Albert
- Sister Arleen Brawley
- Gary Peter Gould
- Brent Hawkes, C.M.
- Thaddeus Holownia
- Carol Loughrey
- Sister Adèle Morin
- Dr. Réjean Thomas
- Marlene Unger
- Kevin Michael Vickers, S.C.

=== Order of Nova Scotia ===
Undress ribbon for a member of the Order of Nova Scotia

- Dr. Margaret Macdonald Casey, C.M., O.N.S., M.D., LL.D. (Hon.), DHumL (Hon.)
- Louis E. Deveau, O.C., O.N.S., P.Eng., LL.D. (Hon.)
- Martin Rudy Haase (Deceased), O.N.S.
- Sharon Hope Irwin, O.N.S., Ed.D., LL.D. (Hon.)
- Alistair MacLeod, O.C, O.N.S., Ph.D., FRSC (Posthumous)

=== Order of Newfoundland and Labrador ===
Undress ribbon for a member of the Order of Newfoundland and Labrador

- Dr. Noel Browne
- Thomas J. Foran
- William D. Mahoney, OMM, CD
- Melba Rabinowitz
- Philip Riteman, ONS
- Cheryl Stagg
- Kellie Walsh
- The Honourable Clyde K. Wells, QC
- Vincent Withers, CM

== Territorial Honours ==
=== Order of Nunavut ===
Undress ribbon for a member of the Order of Nunavut

- Tagak Curley
- Bill Lyall
- Robert Lechat

=== Order of the Northwest Territories ===
Undress ribbon for a member of the Order of Northwest Territories

- Bruce Green
- Lucy Jackson
- Sonny MacDonald
- Gino Pin
- Ruth Spence
- John B. Zoè

== Military Valour Decorations ==
=== Medal of Military Valour ===
Undress ribbon for the Medal of Military Valour

- Sergeant Sébastien Courville, S.M.V., C.D
- Senior Chief Petty Officer Thomas Ratzlaff, S.M.V. (United States Navy SEAL) ((deceased))
- Captain Umberto Mario Suffoletta, S.M.V., C.D.

== Canadian Bravery Decorations ==
=== Star of Courage ===
Undress ribbon for the Star of Courage

- William Ayotte

=== Medal of Bravery ===
Undress ribbon for the Medal of Bravery

- Master Corporal Garet James Avery
- Kent David Bissell
- Thomas Charles Blair
- Sergeant Jason Cary Bromstad, C.D.
- Robert J. Bronson
- Roderick Bruce Brown
- Craig Mitchell Burns
- Mark Joseph Cameron
- Tyler Andrew Campbell
- John Cerne
- Paul David Charbonneau
- Corporal Christopher James Clark, C.D.
- Neil Wayne David Coles
- Micheal James Collicutte
- Marcel Cormier
- Detective Constable Paul Couvillon
- Paul Dallaire
- Eli Lionel Day
- Chief Petty Officer 2nd class Robert Raymond Deproy, C.D.
- Jean-Pierre Désaulniers
- Michael Douglas Dietrich
- Detective Constable Ed Downey
- Constable Steven Michael Enns
- Constable Carl Ethier
- Master Corporal Robert James Featherstone
- Michel Joseph Fecteau
- Kareem Foster
- Tyler Allan Fowler
- Franklyn Patrick Fraser, S.C.
- Jean-Eudes Fraser
- Romey Francis Gerald Fraser
- Kyle Andrew Griffiths
- Matthew Lewin Grogono
- Mathieu Groleau
- Leading Seaman Neil Charles Joseph Harper
- Dale Hession
- Paul Martin Hurst
- Brette Jessica Jameson
- Constable Mark Jenkins
- Dario Kenk
- Wilbert Kent
- Jeremy Kerr
- Master Warrant Officer Volker Kock, C.D.
- Constable Skeeter B. Kruger
- Rachel Lacroix Pilon
- Denis Lainé
- Constable Trevor A. Lamont
- Gregory Robert Landon
- Janelle Lanoix
- Junior Larochelle
- Steven Larochelle
- Joey Leblanc
- Lonney Joseph Lee
- Dion Christopher Lefebvre
- Detective Constable Keith Lindley
- Lionel Stuart Louison
- René Martel
- William Alexander Marshall
- Brian Francis McCormick
- Hailey Nicole Menard
- Constable Scott M. Moir
- Heiko Mueller
- Mike Joseph Murphy
- Shawn Nagurny
- Francis Vijay Nand
- Jeremy David Olson
- Sigurd Allan Olson
- Sergeant Norman Ewen Penny, S.C., C.D
- Haim Peri
- Paul Jakob Peters
- Josée Pilotte
- Courtney Gail Porter
- Corporal Michael E. Postlethwaite
- Daniel Leroy Privé
- Ernest Jason Quick
- Joseph A. Raczkowski
- John D. Redmond
- Robert Reid
- Constable Luc Roberge
- Sergio Rodriguez Sanchez
- Constable Sean Rogan
- Chief Petty Officer 1st class Michael Salter, C.D.
- Constable Charles Sasso
- Michael Vincent Sharpe
- Adam Andrew Shaw
- Allan Randal Shortt
- Kyle Simpson
- James Christopher Daniel Slatcher
- Harry Brad Smith
- Fred St-Pierre
- Constable Chris Stribopoulos
- David Swisher
- Daniel Roland Thibeault
- François Tremblay
- Jacob Tyler
- John Owen Tyler
- Susannah Grayce Utendale
- Gregory Van Langenhove
- Mason James Van Tassell
- Leading Seaman Benne Naeusteter Wiebe
- Daryl James Williams
- Liane Heather Wood
- Daniel Marvin Wood
- Andrew Zaranek
- Constable Jian Zhang
- Constable Jason Allan Baskin
- Leading Seaman Evan Beaton
- Derron Orlando Brown
- David Burns
- Robert Colmor
- Kennedy Brynne Askew Crossland
- Mandeep Singh Dhaliwal
- Shaun Robert Dimit
- Constable Mark Frendo
- Cody Gidney
- Constable James Robert Guthrie
- Harley David Eelis Hakanen
- Bryan Raymond Henzel
- Anthony Hockenhull
- Keith Jacob Hoffman
- Jaden Michael Hornett-Shaw
- Hamid Jennane
- Joe Kayakyuak Karetak Sr.
- Tyler Anthony Kelley
- Constable Clifford J. Leavitt
- Constable Ryan Arnold Wayne Lewis
- Clifford Eugene Lloyd
- Marc Douglas Lloyd
- Warrant Officer Stanley Dwayne Mercredi, C.D.
- Constable James Alan Moir
- Peter Richard Moody
- Brian Joseph Murphy
- Atos Ottawa
- Gérald Ottawa
- Constable Adam D. Palmer
- Constable Clifford William John Peterson
- Constable Douglas Wade Philip
- Constable Fraser Alan Potts
- Corporal Richard Joseph Bryan Yvan Jean Louis Royer
- Jeremy Slaney
- Constable Patrick J. Smith
- Constable Marie-Andrée Tremblay
- Leading Air Cadet Shannon Diane Young

== Meritorious Service Decorations ==
=== Meritorious Service Cross (Military Division) ===
Undress ribbon for Meritious Service Cross in the military division

- Lieutenant-Colonel Joseph Michel Steve Boivin, O.M.M., M.S.M., C.D.
- Sergeant Terrence Gregory Grandy, C.D.
- Brigadier-General Charles Adrien Lamarre, O.M.M., C.D.
- Lieutenant-Colonel Walter Andrew Taylor, C.D.

=== Meritorious Service Cross (Civil Division) ===
Undress ribbon for Meritious Service Cross in the civilian division

- Clara Hughes, O.C., O.M. M.S.C.
- Her Worship Colette Roy Laroche, M.S.C.
- Sarah Burke, M.S.C.

=== Second Award of the Meritorious Service Medal (Military Division) ===
Undress ribbon for the Meritious Service Medal in the military division

- Chief Warrant Officer Stephen Goward Jeans, M.S.M., C.D.

=== Meritorious Service Medal (Military Division) ===
- Major Patrick Lynn Bonneville, M.M.M., C.D.
- Commander Jason Robert Boyd, C.D.
- Major William Michael Church, C.D.
- Lieutenant-General Michael David Dubie (United States Air Force)
- Major Jason Mathew Feyko, C.D.
- Major Joseph Claude Stéphann Grégoire, C.D.
- Master Corporal Mélanie Grenier
- Sergeant Brian Harding
- Brigadier-General Charles Kevin Hyde (United States Air Force)
- Master Corporal Jordan Irvine
- Honorary Lieutenant-Colonel Joseph Luc Lavoie
- Master Warrant Officer Paul Alexander Lucas, C.D.
- Colonel Russell Barry Mann, O.M.M., C.D.
- Major Richard Patrick Mansour, C.D.
- Honorary Colonel John Buckingham Newman, C.D.
- Captain(N) James Douglas O’Reilly, C.D.
- Sergeant Russell Scott Short, C.D.
- Colonel Jeffery Stewart (United States Army)
- Honorary Lieutenant-Colonel Bernard Voyer, O.C., C.Q.

=== Meritorious Service Medal (Civil Division) ===
Undress ribbon for Meritious Service Medal in the civilian division

- Thérèse Tanguay Dion, M.S.M.

== Polar Medal ==
Undress ribbon of the Polar Medal

- Michel Allard
- Marc-André Bernier
- Marianne Douglas
- John Geiger
- Shelagh Grant
- Ryan Harris
- Louie Kamookak
- Gerald W. Kisoun
- Jonathan Moore
- Anne Morgan
- Doug Stenton
- Second Lieutenant Dorothy Tootoo

== Commonwealth and Foreign Orders, Decorations and Medal awarded to Canadians ==
=== From Her Majesty The Queen in Right of the United Kingdom ===
Flag of the United Kingdom of Great Britain and Northern Ireland

==== Officer of the Most Excellent Order of the British Empire ====
- Ms. Elizabeth Anne Carriere
- Mrs. Katharine Davidson

==== Member of the Most Excellent Order of the British Empire ====
- Ms. Denka Shenkman
- Mrs. Carolyn Heather MacLeod

==== Operational Service Medal with Afghanistan Clasp ====
- Captain Timothy S. Holmes-Mitra
- Sergeant Jonathon Dennis McCallum
- Captain Graham Alexander Morgan

==== Ebola Medal for Service in West Africa ====
- Captain Raymond Francis Hartery
- Major Ian Craig Schoonbaert

=== From the President of the Republic of Austria ===
Flag of the Republic of Austria

==== Gold Medal for Services to the Republic of Austria ====
- Mrs. Helga Schmidt

==== Silver Medal for Services to the Republic of Austria ====
- Ms. Elisabeth Canisius
- Mr. Harold Scheer

=== From His Majesty The King of the Belgians ===
Flag of the Kingdom of Belgium

==== Grand Officer of the Order of the Crown ====
- The Honourable Louise Arbour
- The Honourable Teresa Wat

==== Officer of the Order of Leopold II ====
- Mr. Kevin Russell

=== From the President of the French Republic ===
Flag of the French Republic

==== Commander of the National Order of the Legion of Honour ====
- Mr. Dany Laferrière

==== Officer of the National Order of the Legion of Honour ====
- Mr. Jacques Chagnon
- The Honourable Claudette Tardif

==== Knight of the National Order of the Legion of Honour ====
- Lieutenant-General Peter J. Devlin
- Mr. Jacques Gauthier
- Dr. Patrick Barnabé
- Mr. Noble Chummar
- Mr. Kenneth McRoberts
- Mr. Lorenzo Donadeo
- Ms. Dany Sauvageau

==== Officer of the National Order of Merit ====
- Mr. Michel Picard

==== Knight of the National Order of Merit ====
- Major J. A. Marcel Cloutier

==== Knight of the Order of Arts and Letters ====
- Mr. Robert Vézina
- Ms. Carolle Brabant
- Mr. Denis Côté
- Mr. Xavier Dolan
- Ms. Pierrette Robitaille

==== Officer of the Order of the Academic Palms ====
- Mr. André Côté
- Mr. François de Lagrave
- Mr. Stanislav Jozef Kirschbaum
- Mr. Daniel Coderre
- Mr. Rémi Quirion

==== Knight of the Order of the Academic Palms ====
- Ms. Madeleine Bourgeois
- Mr. Serge Courville
- Ms. Lesley Doell
- Mr. Hans-Jürgen Greif
- Ms. Frida Dyshniku Paco
- Mr. Jeff Tennant
- Ms. Jocelyne Faucher

==== National Defence Medal, Bronze Echelon ====
- Major Christian Glauninger
- Major Charles M. A. Mangliar
- Captain Pierre-Luc Nicolas

=== From the President of the Federal Republic of Germany ===
Flag of the Federal Republic of Germany

==== Cross of the Order of Merit of the Federal Republic of Germany ====
- Dr. Elisabeth Trudis Goldsmith-Reber

=== From the President of the Hellenic Republic ===
Flag of the Hellenic Republic

==== Grand Commander of the Order of Honour ====
- Madam Justice Andromache Karakatsanis

=== From the President of Republic of Hungary ===
Flag of the Republic of Hungary

==== Officer's Cross of the Order of Merit (civil division) of the Republic of Hungary ====
- Mr. Levente Laszlo Diosady

==== Knight's Cross of the Order of Merit of the Republic of Hungary (civil division) ====
- Mr. Andre Molnar

==== Gold Cross of Merit (civil division) of the Republic of Hungary ====
- Mr. Tamas Aladar Mihalik

=== From the President of the Republic of Italy ===
Flag of the Republic of Italy

==== Knight of the Order of Merit of the Republic of Italy ====
- Mr. Guido Pellizzari
- Mr. Nicola Sparano
- Mr. Michael Cuccione
- Mr. Franco Di Girolamo
- Mr. Andrea Marani

==== Commander of the Order of the Star of the Republic of Italy ====
- Mr. Luigi Biffis
- Ms. Alberta Cefis
- Mr. Michele Lettieri

=== From His Majesty The Emperor of Japan ===
Flag of the Kingdom of Japan

==== Order of the Rising Sun, Gold and Silver Star ====
- Mr. Donald Campbell

==== Order of the Rising Sun, Gold and Silver Rays ====
- Mr. Martin Blake Kobayashi

=== From the President of the Republic of Korea ===
Flag of the Republic of Korea

==== Order of Civil Merit, Seongnyu Medal ====
- Mr. Vincent Courtenay

==== Order of Merit of the Republic of Korea ====
- Lieutenant (Retired) Edward John Mastronardi
- Ms. Myung Hee Kim

=== From the President of the Republic of Lithuania ===
Flag of the Republic of Lithuania

==== Knight's Cross of the Order of the Lithuanian Grand Duke Gediminas ====
- Ms. Gabija Marija Petrauskas

=== From His Serene Highness The Prince of Monaco ===
Flag of the Principality of Monaco

==== Officer of the Order of Cultural Merit ====
- Ms. Marie-Claire Blais

==== Knight of the Order of Saint Charles ====
- Mr. Patrick Churchill

=== From the Secretary General of the North Atlantic Treaty Organisation ===
Flag of the North Atlantic Treaty Organisation

==== NATO Meritorious Service Medal ====
to Chief Warrant Officer Herbert Alan Sully

=== From His Majesty The Queen of Norway ===
Flag of the Kingdom of Norway

==== Officer of the Royal Norwegian Order of Merit ====
- Ms. Natalie Denesovych
- Ms. Céline Saucier

=== From the President of the Republic of Poland ===
Flag of the Republic of Poland

==== Officer's Cross of the Order of Polonia Restituta ====
- Mr. Andrzej Rozbicki

==== Knight's Cross of the Order of Polonia Restituta ====
- Mr. Wlodzmierz Jaworski

==== Officer's Cross of the Order of Merit of the Republic of Poland ====
- to Mr. Jerzy Kulczycki
- Mr. Richard Sokolowski
- Mr. Slawomir Ruciński
- Mr. Wojciech Jerzy Śniegowski
- Mr. Roman Baraniecki

==== Knight's Cross of the Order of Merit of the Republic of Poland ====
- Ms. Ewa Zadarnowska
- Ms. Teresa Szlamp-Fryga
- Ms. Irena Gostomska
- Dr. Maria Anna Jarochowska
- Ms. Grazyna Krupa
- Ms. Anna Nitoslawska
- Ms. Barbara Poplawska
- Ms. Teresa Jadwiga Wierzbicka
- Mr. Jozef Bogucki
- Mr. Stanley Diamond
- Ms. Janina Freyman
- Mr. Bernard Kmita
- Ms. Elizabeth Kozlowski
- Mr. Frank Simpson

==== Cross of Freedom and Solidarity ====
- Mr. Roman Chojnaki
- Mr. Jerzy Andrzej Kulczycki
- Mr. Zdzislaw Stachowicz

==== Cross with Swords of the Order of the Cross of Independence ====
- Ms. Wanda Jadwiga Kossobudzka

==== Cross of the Order of the Cross of Independence ====
to Mr. Stefan Zadrożny

==== Gold Cross of Merit ====
- Mr. Pawel Ferensowicz
- Mr. Michal Korwin-Szymanowski
- Mr. Andrzej Ruta
- Mr. Jeffrey Simpson
- Mr. Paul Wells
- Mr. Felix Osinski
- Ms. Ewa Miles-Dixon
- Mr. Tadeusz Biernacki
- Mr. Kazimierz Duchowski
- Ms. Hanna Kamler-Szymańska
- Mr. Jerzy Kuśmider
- Mr. Andrzej Miedzianowski
- Mr. Boguslaw Nizio
- Mr. Jerzy Piros
- Mr. Zenon Przybylak
- Mr. Jerzy Steinmetz
- Ms. Krystyna Świrska
- Mr. Maciej Szymański
- Mr. Grzegorz Tautt
- Mr. Ryszard Wrzaskala
- Mr. Maciej Zaremba
- Mr. Edward Karpinski
- Mr. Andrzej Labedz
- Ms. Barbara Ryniec
- Mr. Marek Wawezyczek

==== Silver Cross of Merit ====
- Ms. Irena Borowska-Baker
- Ms. Katherine Rydel
- Mr. Jan Kucy
- Mrs. Urszula Kunikiewicz
- Ms. Teresa Moss
- Mr. Stanislaw Podraza
- Mr. Kazimierz Walewski
- Ms. Grazyna Jędrzejczak
- Ms. Alicja Wojewnik
- Mr. Jerry Kowalski
- Ms. Elzbieta Rulka

==== Siberian Exiles Cross ====
- Mr. Kazimierz Sawoszczuk (posthumously)
- Ms. Stefania Stawecka

==== Long Marital Life Medal ====
- Mrs. Elzbieta Brusilo
- Mr. Kazimierz Brusilo
- Mr. Kazimierz Prosniak
- Mrs. Stanislawa Prosniak
- Mrs. Helena Kuciak
- Mr. Wojciech Kuciak

=== From the President of Portugal ===
Flag of the Republic of Portugal

==== Commander of the Order of Prince Henry ====
- Mr. Carlos Jorge Pinheiro Leitão

==== Commander of the Order of Infante Dom Henrique ====
- Mr. Jean-Pierre Andrieux

=== From the President of the Republic of South Africa ===
Flag of the Republic of South Africa

==== Order of the Companions of O. R. Tambo (Grand Companion — Silver) ====
- The Right Honourable Martin Brian Mulroney, P.C., C.C., G.O.Q.

=== From the President of the Russian Federation ===
Flag of the Russian Federation

==== Pushkin Medal ====
- Archpriest Dimitri Sever

=== From His Majesty The King of Thailand ===
Flag of the Kingdom of Thailand

==== Commander (Third Class) of the Most Exalted Order of the White Elephant of Thailand ====
- Mr. Dennis L. Anderson
- Dr. John R. Lacey

==== Commander (Third Class) of the Most Noble Order of the Crown of Thailand ====
- Mr. Louis P. Desmarais
- Mr. George Heller

=== From the President of the United States of America ===
Flag of the United States of America

==== Commander of the Legion of Merit ====
- Vice-Admiral Mark Arnold Gordon Norman, C.M.M., C.D.
- General Thomas J. Lawson, C.M.M., C.D.

==== Officer of the Legion of Merit ====
- Commodore J. P. Gilles Couturier
- Brigadier-General Wayne D. Eyre
- Lieutenant-General Alain Parent

==== Bronze Star Medal ====
- Major Stephen J. Kuervers
- Lieutenant-Colonel J. C. Martin Arcand
- Major-General (Ret'd) James Robert Ferron

==== Defence Meritorious Service Medal ====
- Lieutenant-Colonel James Patrick Follwell
- Lieutenant-Colonel Paul G. Young
- Major Charles Côté

==== Meritorious Service Medal, Second Oak Leaf Cluster ====
- Lieutenant-Colonel Patrick H. McAdam

==== Meritorious Service Medal ====
- Captain Kevin L. Ciesielski
- Lieutenant-Colonel Edward L. Haverstock
- Major Charles M. A. Mangliar
- Warrant Officer Robert B. McKendry
- Major Michael A. Clement
- Lieutenant-Colonel Matthew Philip Haussmann
- Captain Annie Sheink
- Chief Warrant Officer J. J. Raymond Butler
- Captain Neeraj V. Pandey
- Major Michael Lemire
- Warrant Officer Kelly A. Mullagh
- Master Corporal Paul James Clowe
- Major Sean S. Curley
- Master Warrant Officer David C. Daly
- Colonel Brock Millman
- Lieutenant-Colonel Shane W. Gifford
- Warrant Officer Gary Cunningham

==== Air Medal ====
- Master Corporal Mark A. Keown

== Erratums of Commonwealth and Foreign Orders, Decorations and Medal awarded to Canadians ==
=== Correction of 28 February 2015 ===
- From the President of the French Republic, an Officer of the National Order of the Legion of Honour to Lieutenant-General Peter J. Devlin
- From the President of Greece, a Grand Commander of the Order of Honour to The Honourable Andromache Karakatsanis
- From the President of Portugal, a Commander of the Order of Prince Henry to The Honourable Carlos Jorge Pinheiro Leitão

=== Corrections of 30 May 2015 ===
- From the President of the United States of America, the Bronze Star Medal to Chief Warrant Officer J. J. Raymond Butler
