= Pasch =

Pasch may refer to:

- Passover
- Easter
- Pasch (surname), German and Swedish surname
- Pasch configuration
- Pasch's axiom
- Pasch's theorem
- Pasch egg, easter eggs
- Pasch (horse)

== See also ==
- Basch
- Pascha
