= Basch =

Origin
- Origin: Old Norse, Middle High German
- Region of origin: Northern Europe

Other names
- Variant form: Pasch

Basch is a surname. Notable people with the surname include:

- Anamarija Basch (c. 1893–1979), Yugoslav activist and nurse
- Árpád Basch (1873–1944), Hungarian Jewish painter, graphic artist
- Evert Basch, American electrical engineer
- Franz Anton Basch (also Ferenc Antal Basch; 1901–1946), German Nazi leader in Hungary, executed for war crimes
- Gyula Basch (1859–1928), Hungarian Jewish painter
- Harry Basch (1926–2020), American actor
- Ludwig Basch (1851–1940), Austrian Jewish editor and journalist
- Peter Basch (1921–2004), Austrian-American photographer
- Raphael Basch (1813–1907), Bohemian-Austrian Jewish writer and politician
- Samuel Siegfried Karl von Basch (1837–1905), Jewish Bohemian-Austrian physician
- Victor Basch (1863/5-1944), Jewish Hungarian-French politician
- Andor Basch (1885–1944), Hungarian painter

Fictional:

- Basch fon Ronsenburg, a character in Final Fantasy XII (see List of Final Fantasy XII characters)
- Basch Zwingli, a character in Hetalia Axis Powers

== See also ==
- Batsch (disambiguation)
- Pasch (surname)
