= Paasche =

Paasche is a surname. Notable people with the surname include:

- Eystein Paasche (1932–2016), Norwegian botanist
- Fredrik Paasche (1886–1943), Norwegian educator and author
- Hans Paasche (1881–1920), German politician, pacifist, ethnologist, and writer; son of Hermann
- Hermann Paasche (1851–1925), German statistician and economist
- Johan Henrik Paasche Thorne (1843–1920), Norwegian businessperson and politician
- Øystein Paasche (born 1963), Norwegian musician and drummer

== See also ==
- Paasche Airbrush Company, Chicago, USA
- Paasche index
- Paasche's index
- Pasche
- Paasch
- Pasch (surname)
