= Anna Maria (given name) =

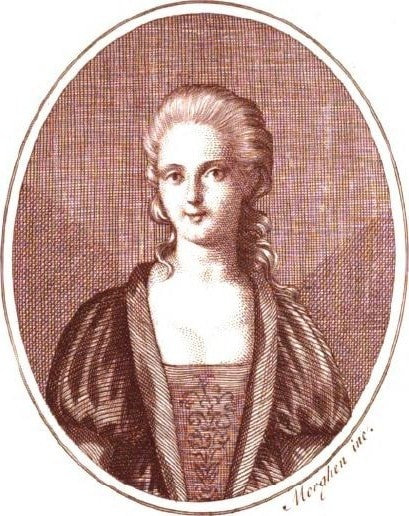
Anna Maria Arduino

Anna Maria is a feminine given name.

Notable people with the name include:

== People ==
- Anna Maria Alberghetti (born 1936), Italian operatic singer and actress
- Anna Maria Arduino (1663–1700), 17th century writer and painter, the Princess of Piombino from Messina, Sicily.
- Anna Maria Bietti Sestieri (1942–2023), Italian archaeologist
- Anna-Maria Borissova (born 1950), Bulgarian endocrinologist, professor, Minister of Health
- Anna-Maria Botsari (born 1972), Greek chess player
- Anna Maria Crouch (1763–1805), British singer and actress
- Ana María de Huarte y Muñiz (1786–1861), Empress consort, wife of Agustin I of Mexico
- Anna Maria Ehrenstrahl (1666–1729), Swedish painter
- Anna-Maria Fernandez (born 1960), American tennis player
- Anna Maria Ferrero (1935–2018), Italian actress
- Anna Maria Fox (1816–1897), English philanthropist
- Anna-Maria Gradante (born 1976), German judoka
- Anna Maria Groot, Dutch model and Miss Europe winner
- Anna Maria Guarnieri (born 1934), Italian actress
- Anna Maria Hall (1800–1881), Irish novelist
- Anna Maria Horsford (born 1948), American film actress
- Anna Maria Hussey (1805–1853), British mycologist, writer, and illustrator
- Anna Maria Indrio (born 1943), Italian-Danish architect
- Anna Maria Jopek (born 1970), Polish musician and singer
- Anna Maria Klechniowska (1888–1973), Polish music educator and composer
- Anna Maria Komorowska (born 1954), Polish noblewoman
- Anna Maria Lenngren (1754–1817), Swedish writer
- Anna Maria Luisa de' Medici (1667–1742), Italian noblewoman
- Anna Maria Mozzoni (1837–1920), Italian political activist
- Anna Maria Muccioli (born 1964), Sammarinese politician
- Anna Maria Mühe (born 1985), German actress
- Anna-Maria Müller (1949–2009), German luger
- Anna María Nápoles, American behavioral epidemiologist and science administrator
- Anna Maria Nilsson (born 1983), Swedish biathlete
- Anna Maria of Anhalt (1561–1605), German noblewoman
- Anna Maria of Hesse-Kassel (1567–1626), German princess
- Anna Maria of Hungary, Empress of Bulgaria
- Anna Maria of Mecklenburg-Schwerin (1627–1669), German noblewoman
- Anna Maria of Ostfriesland (1601–1634), German noblewoman
- Anna Maria Ortese (1914–1998), Italian short story writer and poet
- Anna Maria Perez de Taglé (born 1990), American actress and singer
- Anna Maria Picarelli (born 1984), Italian footballer
- Anna Maria Porter (1778–1832), English poet and novelist
- Anna Maria Priestman (1828–1914), British social reformer and women's rights activist
- Anna Maria Rizzoli (born 1951), Italian actress
- Anna Maria Rückerschöld (1725–1805), Swedish author
- Anna Maria Sandri (born 1936), Italian actress
- Anna Maria Schwegelin, German alleged witch
- Anna Maria Strada, Italian soprano
- Anna Maria Taigi (1769–1837), Italian beatified woman
- Anna Maria Tarantola (born 1945), Italian manager
- Anna Maria Tatò (1940–2022), Italian film director
- Anna Maria Thelott, Swedish artist
- Anna Maria Toso, Italian paralympic athlete
- Anna Maria Tremonti (born 1957), Canadian journalist
- Anna Maria van Schurman (1607–1678), Dutch artist, poet and scholar
- Anna Maria Wells, American poet and writer
- Anna Maria Żukowska (born 1983), Polish politician and jurist
- Anna Russell, Duchess of Bedford (1783–1857), birth name Anna Maria Stanhope
- Princess Anna Maria of Sweden (1545–1610), Swedish princess
- Queen Anna Maria (born 1946), wife of Constantine II, king of Greece
- Ana María, nom-de-guerre of the second in command of the Salvadorian guerrilla organization Fuerzas Populares de Liberación Farabundo Martí

== Fictional ==
- Anna Maria, a fictional rat in The Tale of Samuel Whiskers or The Roly-Poly Pudding
- Anna Maria Marconi, a fictional character in The Superior Spider-Man #5 (May 2013) created by Dan Slott and Giuseppe Camuncoli.

== See also ==
- Annamaria
- Maria Anna
