= Árpád Basch =

Hungarian artist (1873–1944)

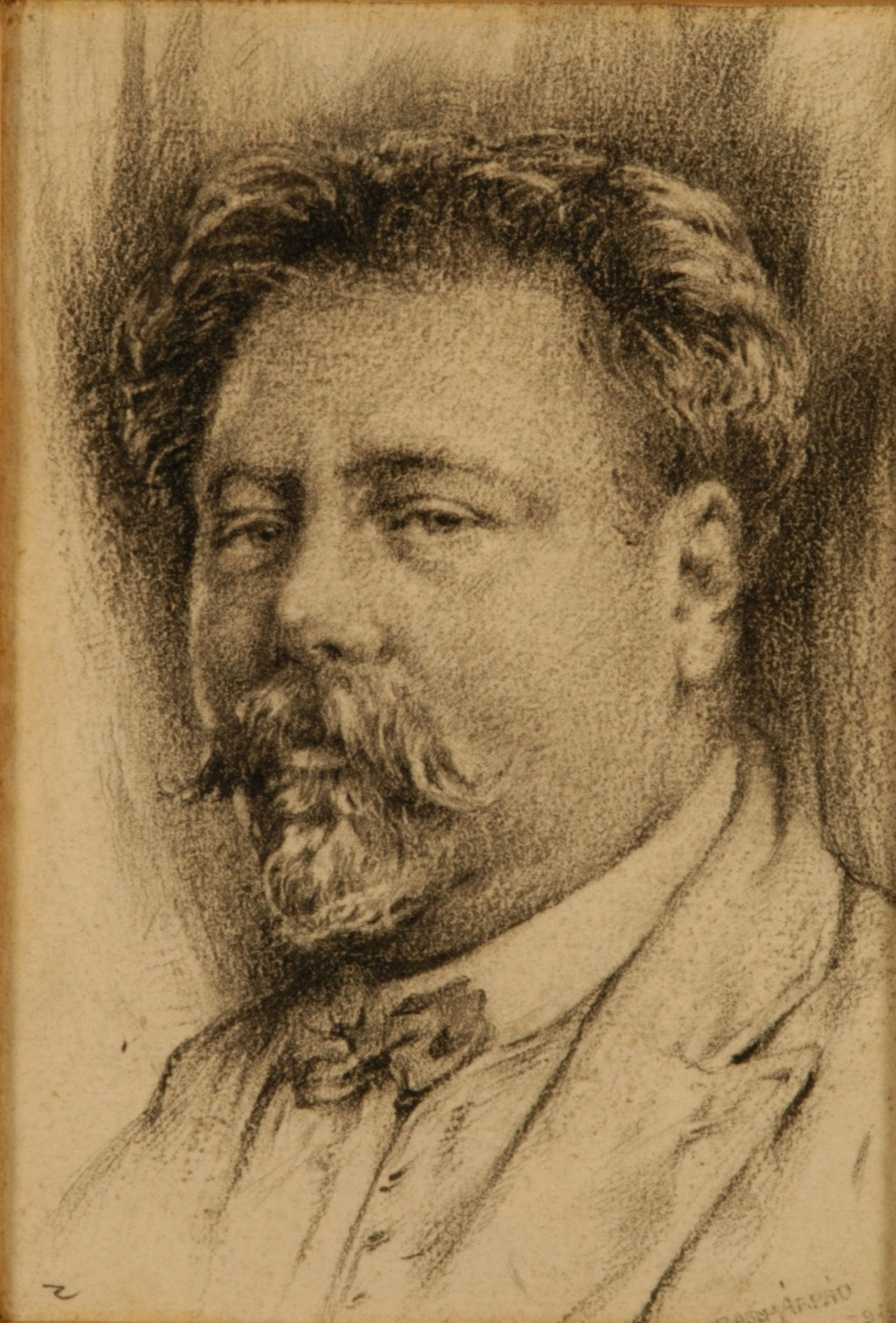
- Self portrait
- Born: April 16, 1873; Budapest, Hungary
- Died: 1944 (aged 70–71); Budapest
- Known for: Painter and graphic artist

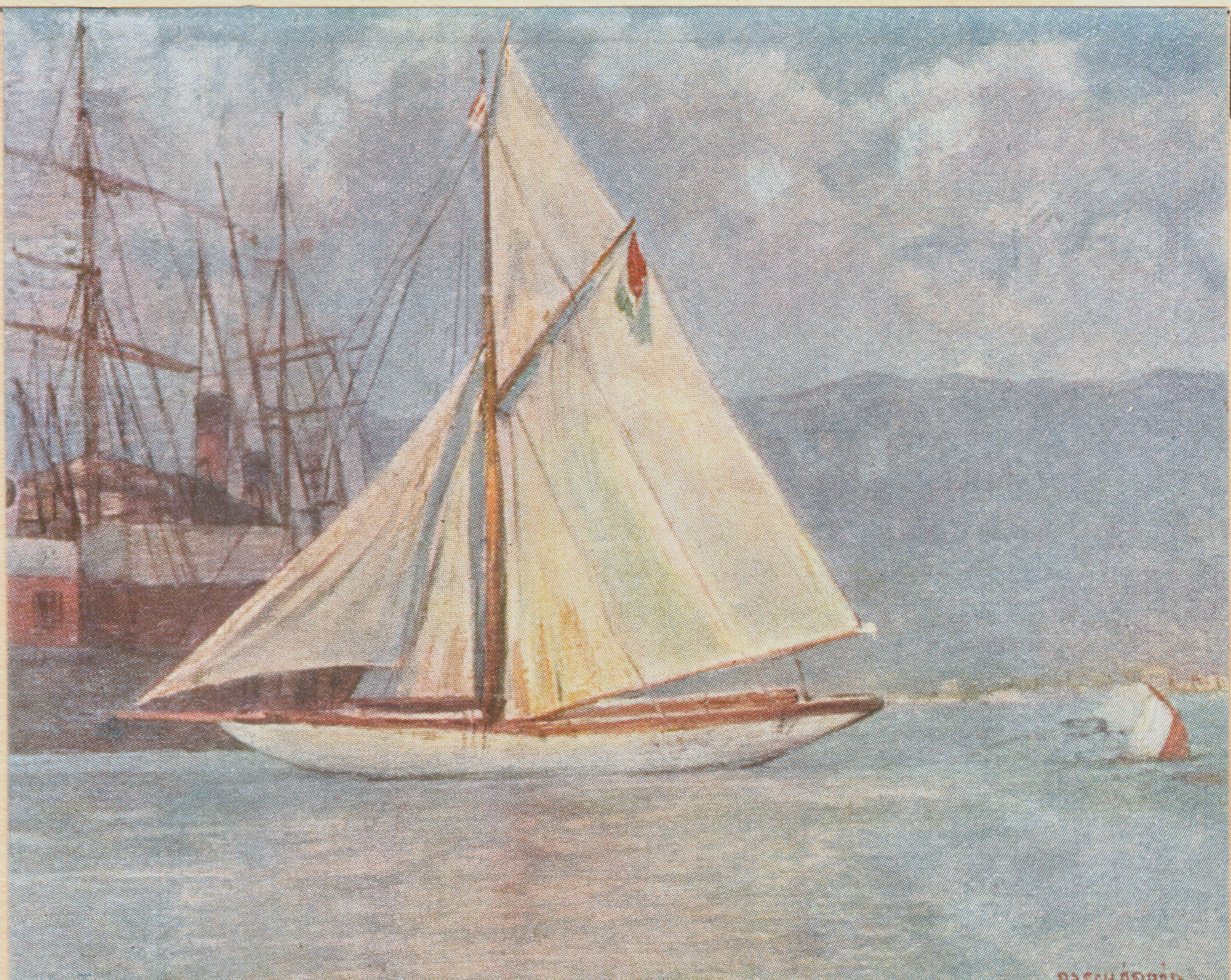
Árpád Basch - Sirály

Árpád Basch (April 16, 1873, Budapest - 1944, Budapest) was a Hungarian painter and graphic artist.

== Biography ==
Initially intending to follow an industrial career, Basch attended training at the Department of Metallurgy at the Staatliche Mittelschule (government school) for one year, after which he decided to become an artist.

He trained under Simon Hollósy in Munich, Bihari and Karlovsky in Budapest and Léon Bonnat, Dousset, and Jean Paul Laurens in Paris. He returned once more to Budapest, where he became the art editor of the Magyar Genius, a Hungarian publication. He painted several commissions for the Millennia Exposition, and devoted considerable attention to poster painting. He was a collaborator on "The Poster" and on "Les Maîtres de l'Affiche", but his principal occupation was water-color decorative painting.

== Sources ==
- Ferencz Herceg: Szelek szárnyán 1905

== See also ==
- Basch
- Gyula Basch
