= Maria of Bavaria =

Maria of Bavaria can refer to:

- Maria Anna of Bavaria (disambiguation), several people
- Duchess Maria Antonia of Bavaria (1724–1780), German composer, singer, harpsichordist and patron
- Maria Josepha of Bavaria (1739–1767), Holy Roman Empress
- Maria Sophie of Bavaria (1841–1925), the last queen consort of the Kingdom of the Two Sicilies
- Princess Maria Ludwiga Theresia of Bavaria (1872–1954), daughter of Ludwig III and Maria Theresia of Austria-Este
- Princess Maria Elisabeth of Bavaria (1914–2011)
