= Pasche =

Pasche is family name of German descent, with variations including Paasche and Pasch; it may refer to:

- Alexandre Pasche (born 1991), Swiss football player
- Alden Pasche (1910–1986), basketball head coach
- John Pasche, British art designer
- Matheus Pasche, Brazilian Economist
- Valentine Pasche, a Swiss comics creator

== See also ==
- Pasche New York, a company founded to promote the musical career of Ashley Alexandra Dupré
- Pasche Institute, an institute at Criswell College
