= Anamarija =

Anamarija is a Croatian and Slovenian feminine given name, the South Slavic form of Annamaria.

== People with the given name ==
- Anamarija Basch (c. 1893–1979), Yugoslav activist and nurse
- Anamarija Blažević (born 1979), Croatian politician
- Anamarija Lampič (born 1995), Slovenian biathlete and former cross-country skier
- Anamarija Petričević (born 1972), retired Croatian swimmer
- Anamarija Stibilj Šajn, Slovenian art historian
- Anamarija Viček (born 1973), Hungarian politician in Serbia

== Other spellings ==
- Ana-Marija Markovina (born 1970), Croatian classical pianist
- Ana Marija Marović (1815–1887), Italian writer and painter of Serbian origin
- Ana-Marija Begić (born 1994), Croatian female basketball player
