= Archduchess Maria Anna of Austria =

Archduchess Maria Anna of Austria may refer to:

Name	Birth/death	Parents	Spouse(s)
Maria Anna of Spain	1606–1646	Philip III of Spain; Margaret of Austria, Queen of Spain	Ferdinand III, Holy Roman Emperor
Archduchess Maria Anna of Austria (1610–1665), Electress of Bavaria	1610–1665	Ferdinand II, Holy Roman Emperor von Habsburg; Maria Anna of Bavaria	Maximilian I, Elector of Bavaria
Mariana of Austria, Queen consort of Spain	1634–1696	Ferdinand III of Hungary; Maria Anna of Spain	Philip IV of Spain
Maria Anna of Austria, Queen consort of Portugal	1683–1754	Leopold I, Holy Roman Emperor; Eleonor Magdalene of Neuburg	John V of Portugal
Archduchess Maria Anna of Austria (governor) (1718–1744), Governor of the Austrian Netherlands	1718–1744	Charles VI, Holy Roman Emperor; Elisabeth Christine of Brunswick-Wolfenbüttel	Prince Charles Alexander of Lorraine
Archduchess Maria Anna of Austria (1738–1789), abbess of the Imperial and Royal Convent for Noble Ladies in Prague	1738–1789	Francis I, Holy Roman Emperor; Maria Theresa of Austria	never married
Archduchess Maria Anna of Austria (1770–1809), Abbess at the Theresian Convent in Prague	1770–1809	Leopold II, Holy Roman Emperor; Maria Luisa of Spain	never married
Archduchess Marie Anne of Austria (1804–1858)	1804–1858	Francis II, Holy Roman Emperor; Maria Theresa of Naples and Sicily	never married
Archduchess Maria Anna of Austria (1835–1840)	1835–1840	Archduke Franz Karl of Austria; Princess Sophie of Bavaria	never married
Archduchess Maria Anna of Austria (1882–1940)	1882–1940	Archduke Friedrich, Duke of Teschen; Princess Isabella of Croÿ	Elias, Duke of Parma
Archduchess Maria-Anna of Austria, Princess Galitzine	born 1954	Archduke Rudolf of Austria; Countess Xenia Czernichev-Besobrasov	Prince Piotr Galitzine

== See also ==
- Anna of Austria (disambiguation)
- Maria Anna (disambiguation)
- Archduchess Maria of Austria (disambiguation)
