= Batch =

Batch may refer to:

== Food and drink ==
- Batch (alcohol), an alcoholic fruit beverage
- Batch loaf, a type of bread popular in Ireland
- A dialect term for a bread roll used in North Warwickshire, Nuneaton and Coventry, as well as on the Wirral, England
- Small batch, bourbon whiskey blended from selected barrels
- Wiser's Small Batch, a Canadian whisky made in limited batches by Corby Distillery Ltd, Belleville, Ontario, Canada

== Manufacturing and technology ==
- Batch distillation, the use of distillation in batches
- Batch oven, a furnace used for thermal processing
- Batch production, a manufacturing technique
- Batch reactor, a type of vessel widely used in the process industries
- Fed-batch, a biotechnological batch process
- Glass batch calculation, the determination of the correct mix of raw materials for a glass melt
- Sequencing batch reactor, an industrial processing tank for the treatment of wastewater
- Batching & mixing plants, used in concrete production

== Computer science ==
- Batch (Unix), a command to queue jobs for later execution
- Batch file, a text file containing a series of commands intended to be executed in DOS, OS/2, and Microsoft Windows
- Batch Monitor, a software program created by Apple Computer for viewing and monitoring encoding tasks
- Batch processing, the execution of a series of programs on a computer without human interaction
- Batch renaming, the process of renaming multiple computer files and folders in an automated fashion
- DEC BATCH-11/DOS-11, a computer operating system developed by Digital Equipment Corporation
- Portable Batch System, computer software that performs job scheduling
- Spring Batch, an open source framework for batch processing
- Batch learning, a machine learning technique

== People ==
- Baron Batch (born 1987), American football running back
- Emil Batch (1880–1926), American baseball player
- Colin Batch (born 1958), Australian hockey player
- Charlie Batch (born 1974), American football quarterback

== Places ==
- Barns Batch Spinney, a geological Site of Special Scientific Interest near Dundry, Somerset, England
- Beacon Batch, the summit area of Black Down, the highest hill in the Mendip Hills, Somerset, England
- Beardly Batch, a hamlet in the parish of Pilton, Somerset, England

== Miscellaneous ==
- Batch (album), an album by pop-punk band Big Drill Car
- Bach (New Zealand), pronounced "batch", a type of beach holiday home found in New Zealand

== See also ==
- Basch, a surname
- Batsch (disambiguation)
