= Maria Anna =

Maria Anna may refer to:

- Archduchess Maria Anna of Austria (1738–1789), the second but eldest surviving daughter of Maria Theresa, Queen of Hungary and Bohemia, and Francis I, Holy Roman Emperor.
- Maria Anna Adamberger (1752–1804), Viennese actress
- Maria Anna de Raschenau, eighteenth-century Viennese composer and nun
- Maria Anna Mozart, sister of Wolfgang Amadeus Mozart
- Maria Anna of Bavaria (1805–1877), Queen consort of Saxony
- Maria Anna of Neuburg (1667–1740), Queen consort of Spain
- Maria Anna of Portugal (1843–1884)
- Maria Anna of Savoy (1803–1884), daughter of Victor Emmanuel I of Sardinia and wife of Emperor Ferdinand I of Austria
- Maria Anna of Spain (1606–1646), aka Maria Anna of Austria, daughter of Philip III of Spain and wife of Ferdinand III, Holy Roman Emperor
- Maria Anna Sophia of Saxony (1728–1797)
- Maria Anna Thekla Mozart, cousin of Wolfgang Amadeus Mozart
- Maria Anna von Genzinger (1754–1793), Viennese amateur musician and friend of Joseph Haydn
- Maria Anna Jarochowska (1924–2018), Polish-born Canadian geographer, historian
- Maria-Anna Galitzine (born 1954), Catholic activist

== See also ==
- Anna Maria (disambiguation)
- Maria Anna of Bavaria (disambiguation)
- Archduchess Maria Anna of Austria (disambiguation)
- Archduchess Maria of Austria (disambiguation)
