= Anna Maria =

Anna Maria may refer to:

== People ==
- Anna Maria (given name), including a list of people and characters with the name
- Anna Maria (violinist) (c. 1696 – 1782), an Italian violinist

== Places ==
- Anna Maria, Florida
- Anna Maria Island, Florida

== Institutions ==
- Anna Maria College, in Paxton, Massachusetts

== See also ==
- Annamaria
- Anamaria
- Maria Anna (disambiguation)
