= Andor Basch =

Hungarian painter (1885–1944)

Basch, Andor
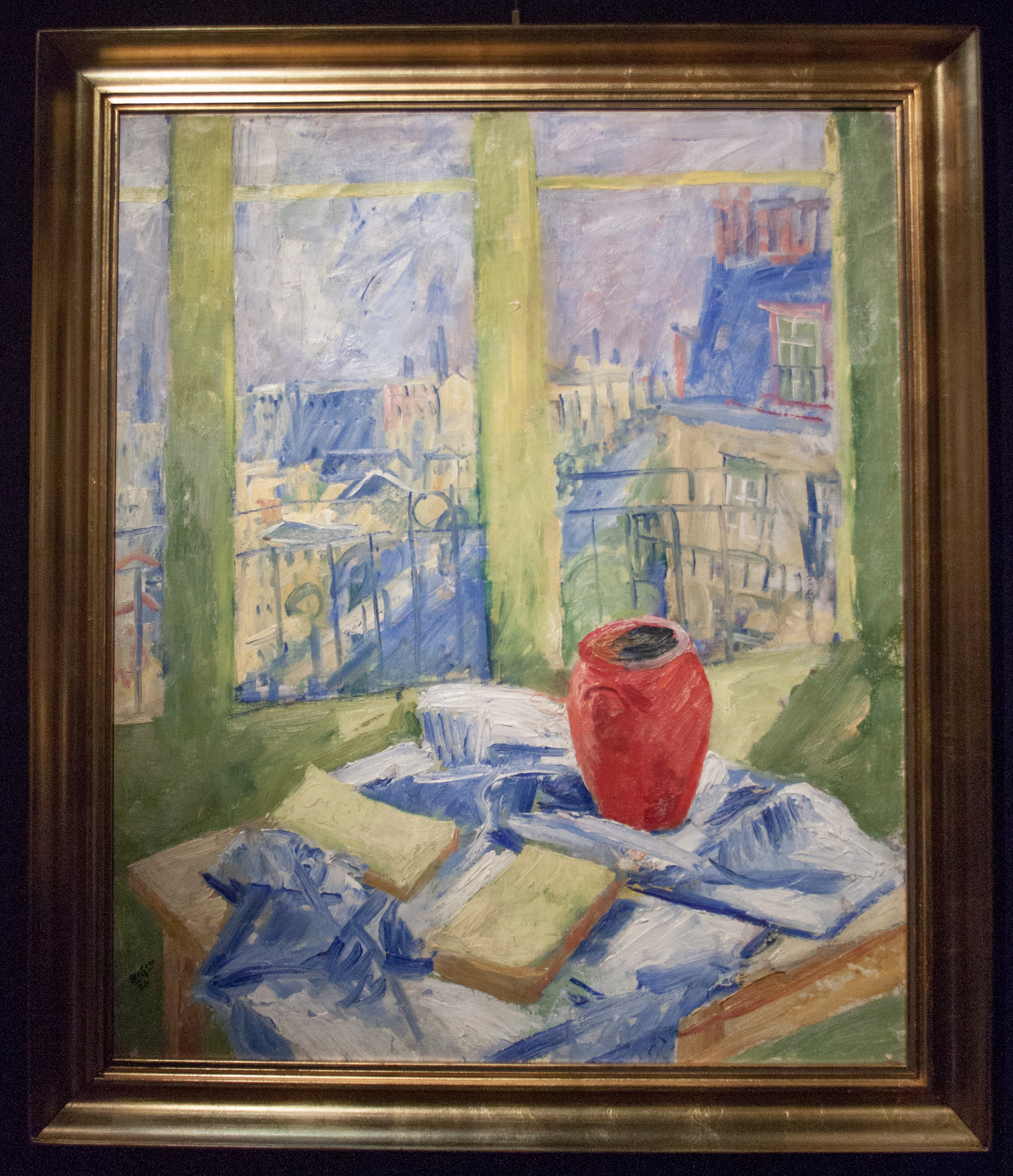
- Born: Basch, Andor; 1885; Budapest
- Died: 1944 (aged 58–59); Budapest

Andor Basch (May 19, 1885 – June 24, 1944) was a Hungarian painter whose works have been featured in the Hungarian National Gallery. He is the son of painter Gyula Basch.

== His life ==
He was born into a wealthy Jewish family in Budapest. His mother Róza Krausz (Terezia); his father was Gyula Basch, a well-known portrait and portrait painter of his time. Andor Basch graduated from the Catholic high school after being baptized in 1899. He was a student of Tivadar Zemplényi, who represented the academic style, at the Model Drawing School in Budapest. From 1904, he continued his art studies in Paris, where he studied with Jean-Paul Laurens at the famous Julian Academy and spent a year at Henri Matisse's private school. In 1908, he went to Baia Mare (Nagybánya), where for three years he was tutored by Károly Ferenczy, one of the defining personalities of the painting school.

He presented his pictures for the first time in 1919 at a joint exhibition in the Ernst Museum (Budapest). In the next few years he traveled around Italy, and in 1925 he moved to Paris. He regularly participated in exhibitions, managed to sell his pictures, and received both financial and moral recognition. He found his own style with difficulty; for a while he retreated from the "fine art witch dance" (he wrote in a letter) and the lifestyle of the capital to the South of France, and in 1931 "Andor Basch, resurrected from the dust, presented himself at a collection exhibition in Paris.

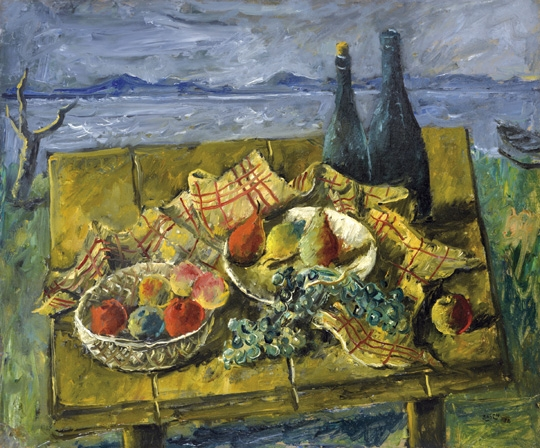
Lakeside still life

Due to the economic crisis, he returned home in 1932 and settled in Budapest. He lived withdrawn from the domestic art life, but he continued to show his pictures at exhibitions in Budapest and abroad.

Although he did not consider himself a Jew, since he was baptized at the age of 14, he was classified as a Jew according to Jewish laws. He ended his life by shooting himself in the head on June 24, 1944, during the persecution of Jews that developed after the German occupation of Hungary. Katalin S. Nagy wrote of him that he committed suicide to escape the Jewish fate. His wife was Erzsébet Guttmann.

His Self-Portrait (1944), painted shortly before his suicide, is "a gloomy, lyrical confession of a pure man amidst the horrors of a murderous world full of hate." His memorial exhibition was held in 1965 at the Hungarian National Gallery.

== Independent exhibitions ==
- 1921, Amsterdam and Helsingfors
- 1922, Stockholm
- 1926, Brussels
- 1929, Nuremberg
- 1931, Paris and Zurich
- 1932, Budapest, Ernst Museum
- 1937, Vienna
- 1941, Budapest, Tamás Gallery (40 paintings)
- 1943, Budapest, Tamás Gallery (36 paintings)
