= Batsch (disambiguation) =

Batsch may refer to:

- Batsch, taxonomic author abbreviation of August Batsch (1761–1802), German naturalist and authority on mushrooms
- Mieczysław Batsch (1900–1977), Polish soccer forward
- Bill Batsch (1892–1963), American Major League Baseball player
- Batsch affair, 1872 diplomatic incident between Haiti and Germany
- Batsch County, alternative name for the former Bács-Bodrog County of the Kingdom of Hungary, now part of Serbia

== See also ==
- Basch, a surname
- Batch (disambiguation)
