= Fran Rider =

Canadian ice hockey executive

Fran Rider CM OOnt is a Canadian ice hockey executive, and former player. She began playing ice hockey in 1967, with the Brampton Canadettes, the predecessor to the Brampton Thunder. Rider is one of the founders of the Ontario Women's Hockey Association and played a significant role in expanding women's national and international competitions. Rider was inducted into the IIHF Hall of Fame in 2015 in recognition of her substantial impact on the growth and development of the modern game of women's hockey.

== Ontario Women's Hockey Association (OWHA) ==
The Ontario Women's Hockey Association (OWHA) was formed in 1975 to generate interest in and support the development of women's ice hockey. Rider was the association's founding executive director, and in 1982 she became president of CEO. That same year, the OWHA formally joined Hockey Canada, and Rider became a member of Hockey Canada's female council.

== Organized women's ice hockey competition ==
=== Canadian ===
Rider was instrumental in setting up a national championship for women's ice hockey, called the Esso Women's Hockey Nationals, which was the Canadian senior women's championship from 1982 to 2008. With the evolution of the Nationals into a professional tournament, Hockey Canada elected to discontinue it in 2008 and replace it with a national female midget championship known as the Esso Cup.

=== International ===
Rider was also a key figure in helping organize the 1987 World Women's Hockey Tournament, which was hosted in Toronto, Ontario. The OWHA hosted the tournament, which was not recognized by the International Ice Hockey Federation (IIHF) and was therefore considered an unofficial event. During the tournament, representatives from participating nations met to establish a strategy to lobby the IIHF for the creation of a Women's World Championship.

In 1990, Rider helped organize the first IIHF-sanctioned tournament for women's ice hockey which was held in Ottawa, Ontario. The 1990 IIHF Women's World Championship received substantial financial support from the Canadian Amateur Hockey Association.

Working closely with European colleagues, Rider then turned attention towards getting women's hockey into the Winter Olympics, with the hope of having the sport included in the 1994 Winter Games in Lillehammer, Norway. Although this goal was not met, women's hockey debuted four years later at the 1998 Winter Olympics in Nagano, Japan.

== Recognition for women's excellence in sport ==
When Angela James was inducted into the Hockey Hall of Fame on November 8, 2010, she said that without Rider, she would never have made it into the Hockey Hall of Fame.

Rider was appointed Member of the Order of Canada (CM) in the 2015 Canadian honours, "for her contributions to the development of women’s hockey, both at the national and international levels". In 2016, she was appointed a Member of the Order of Ontario (OOnt). Along with Scotty Bowman and Murray Costello, Rider was among the 2017 class named to the Order of Hockey in Canada.

== Accolades ==
- The Fran Rider Cup was an award named in her honor and given to the silver medal-winning team at the annual Esso Women's Hockey Nationals.
- Rider was the first female recipient of the Canadian Amateur Hockey Association's Award of Merit.
- Awarded the Ontario Hockey Association's Minor Hockey Service Award. Rider became the first woman to claim that honour.
- Received the Ontario Hockey Association's (OHA) Gold Stick Award and became the first woman in forty five years to have the honor bestowed upon her.
- Awarded the Ontario Ministry of Culture and Citizenship's Contribution to Sport Award
- Inducted into the Mississauga Sports Hall of Fame (2001)
- Inducted into the IIHF Hall of Fame in 2015.

== Personal ==
During May 2018, Rider was part of a group of four female athletes, including Cassie Campbell, Jen Kish, and Kerrin Lee-Gartner, to publicly pledge their brain to a Canadian research centre. The posthumous donation shall be made to Toronto Western Hospital’s Canadian Concussion Centre to further research on the effect of trauma on women’s brains.
