= Anamaria =

Anamaria is a feminine given name. Notable people with the name include:

- Anamaria Govorčinović (born 1997), Croatian canoeist
- Anamaria Ioniță (born 1988), Romanian athlete
- Anamaria Marinca (born 1978), Romanian actress
- Anamaria Nesteriuc (born 1993), Romanian hurdler
- Anamaria Ocolișan (born 1997), Romanian artistic gymnast
- Anamaria Tămârjan (born 1991), Romanian artistic gymnast
- Anamaria Vartolomei (born 1999), French-Romanian actress

== Fictional characters ==
- Anamaria, a character in the film Pirates of the Caribbean: The Curse of the Black Pearl

== Other ==
- Anamaria (plant), a genus of plants in the family Plantaginaceae

== See also ==
- Ana María (1929–1983), Salvadoran revolutionary
- Annamaria
- Anna Maria (disambiguation)
