= Franz Anton Basch =

Hungarian politician (1901–1946)

Dr. Franz Anton Basch
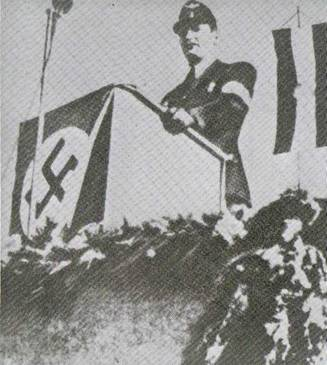
- Basch in 1940
- Born: July 13, 1901; Zurich
- Died: April 27, 1946 (aged 44)
- Other name: Basch Ferenc Antal
- Occupation: Shwovish Nazi politician
- Known for: the chairman of Volksbund der Deutschen in Ungarn (VDU), the leader of the Shwovish community in Hungary

Dr. Franz Anton Basch (Hungarian: Basch Ferenc Antal) (13 July 1901 – 27 April 1946) was a Shwovish Nazi politician, the chairman of Volksbund der Deutschen in Ungarn (VDU) and the leader of the Shwovish community in Hungary.

Franz Basch was born in Zurich in 1901. He was a student of the more moderate nationalist activist Jakob Bleyer and earned his doctorate at the University of Budapest between 1920 and 1924. He matriculated at the Ludwig-Maximilians-Universität München on 5 December 1925 In 1925, he became the secretary of the German Cultural Society. He published many works in this period.

From 1930, he began to express extreme nationalist propaganda and became a follower of Nazism. In 1934, he resigned his position because he affronted the Hungarian nation with his ideas. In 1938, he founded the Racial Union Of Germans In Hungary (the Volksbund or VDU) and became its chairman, organizing it along Nazi lines with the financial backing of the Third Reich. In 1939, Basch took the title Volksgruppenführer (Racial Group Leader) of the ethnic Germans in Hungary. In 1940, Hitler appointed him the leader of Germans in Hungary (the Danube Swabians and the Transylvanian Saxons). In the first two enlistment periods of ethnic Germans in Hungary in 1942 and 1943, Franz Basch, as head of the VDU, actively participated and was responsible for enlisting over 40,000 Hungarian citizens in the Waffen-SS for Nazi Germany.

At the end of 1944, he escaped to Germany but was captured by the Americans and sent back to Hungary in 1945. He was tried and sentenced to death for war crimes and executed in Budapest in 1946. A detailed but sympathetic analysis of Basch's trial is available in Seewann and Spannenberger (1999).

== See also ==
- Basch
