= Adeera Levin =

Professor of Medicine

Professor Adeera Levin FRCPC
- Education: University of Toronto
- Alma mater: McMaster University Medical School
- Known for: Nephrology
- Awards: The Order of Canada
- Scientific career
- Fields: Nephrology
- Workplaces: University of British Columbia

Adeera Levin is a Canadian Professor of Medicine, and is head of the Division of Nephrology at University of British Columbia.

== Education and early career ==
Levin earned a BSc degree at University of Toronto (1977–81) and an MD at McMaster University Medical School (1981–84). She stayed on as an Internal Medicine Resident, before moving to Henderson General Hospital (now Juravinski Hospital) to become Chief Medical Resident in 1986. She was a Clinical Fellow in Nephrology at Toronto Western Hospital & St. Michael's Hospital (Toronto). She was then a Clinical Research Fellow in Nephrology starting in 1988.

== Research ==
Her primary area of interest is looking at risk factors in chronic kidney disease (CKD) patients.

She is also the Principal investigator of the CAN SOLVE CKD grant award.

== Other positions ==
- President of International Society of Nephrology (2015–2017)
- Former editor-in-Chief of Canadian Journal of Kidney Health & Disease
- Consultant nephrologist at Providence Health Care/St. Paul's Hospital
- Executive Director of the BC Provincial Renal Agency

== Awards ==
- 2013 – Canadian Society of Nephrology Outstanding Contributions to Canadian Nephrology
- 2014 – Kidney Foundation of Canada Research medal of Excellence
- 2014 – Fellowship of the Canadian Academy of Health Sciences
- 2015 – National Kidney Foundation’s International Distinguished Medal
- 2015 – Aubrey J Tingle Research Award from the Michael Smith Foundation for Health Research
- 2015 – The Order of Canada
- 2025 – The King Charles III Coronation Medal

== Selected publications ==
- Levin, Adeera; Stevens, Paul E. (January 2014). "Summary of KDIGO 2012 CKD Guideline: behind the scenes, need for guidance, and a framework for moving forward". Kidney International. 85 (1): 49–61. doi:10.1038/ki.2013.444. PMID 24284513.
- Co-author of textbook: “Chronic Kidney Disease: a practical guide to understanding and management”, ISBN 9780199549313
