= Dorothée Gizenga =

Congolese political activist (1961–2022)

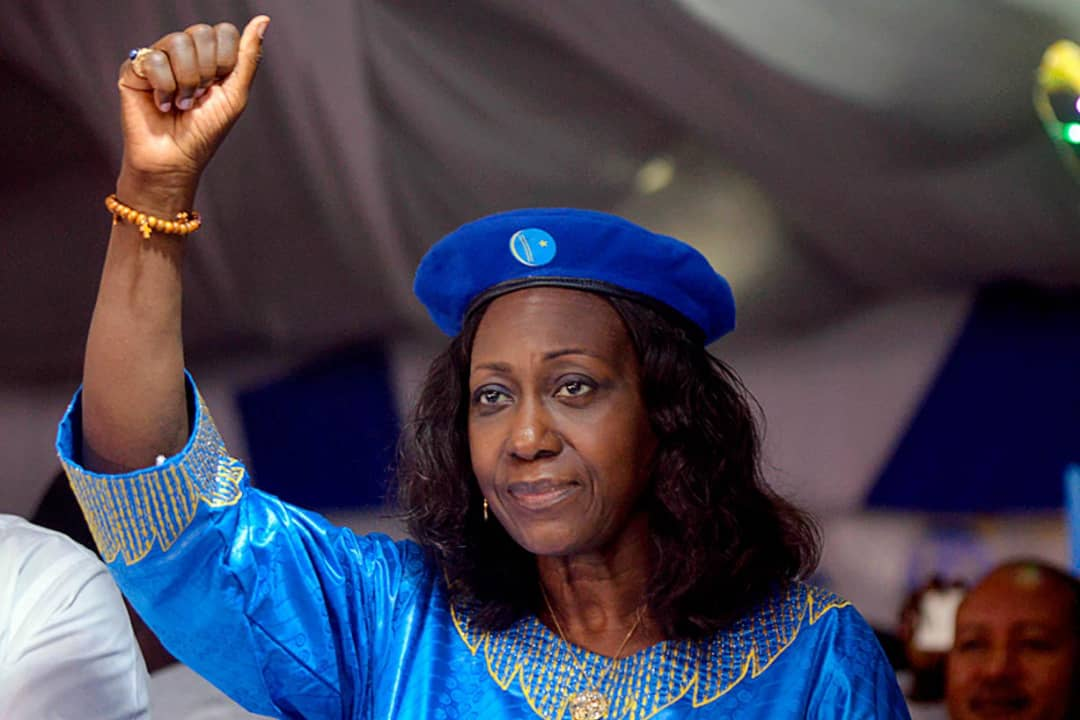
- Gizenga in 2021
- Born: 29 September 1961; Kisangani, Congo-Léopoldville
- Died: 18 February 2022 (aged 60); Kinshasa, Congo-Kinshasa
- Education: University of Saskatchewan; York University
- Occupation: Political activist
- Political party: Unified Lumumbist Party

Dorothée Gizenga (29 September 1961 – 18 February 2022) was a Congolese political activist.

== Biography ==
Gizenga was born in Kisangani on 29 September 1961 to Antoine Gizenga and Asta Marie-thérèse Mondili. Her brother was Lugi Gizenga. She earned a degree in economics from York University and a master's degree in chemistry from the University of Saskatchewan.

After spending 37 years in Canada, Gizenga returned to the Democratic Republic of the Congo in 2019. Upon her return, she became Secretary-General of the Unified Lumumbist Party (PALU). Her brother put her in charge of organizing a party unification congress. After her brother's death in June 2020, she assumed several positions within the party, including PALU representative in Canada and assistant coordinator for external relations.

Gizenga died in Kinshasa on 18 February 2022, at the age of 60.
