= Fredrik Paasche =

Norwegian educator, author and literary historian

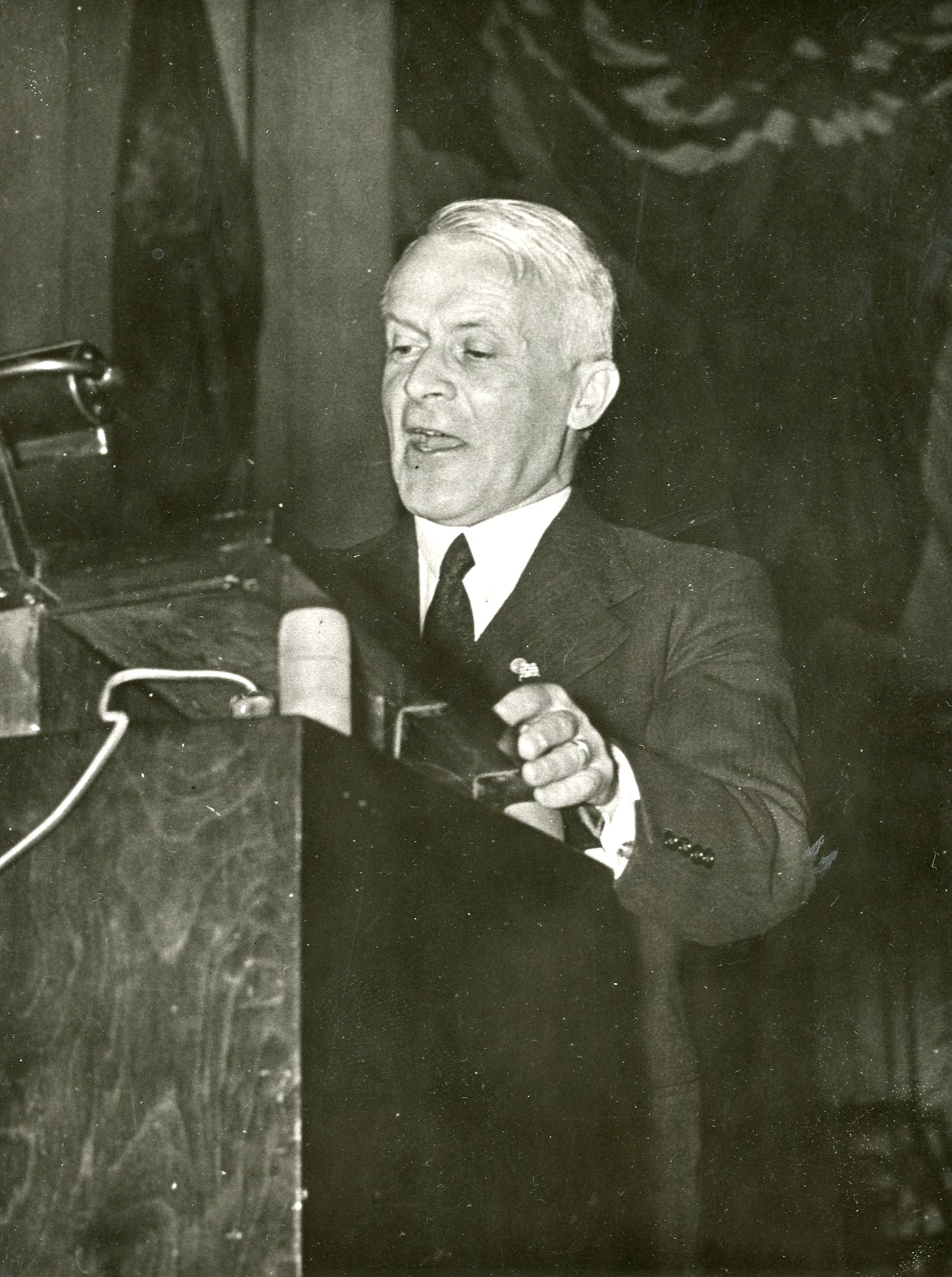
- Born: Fredrik Amundsen; 3 February 1886; Bindal, Norway
- Died: 1 September 1943 (aged 57); Uppsala, Sweden
- Education: Royal Frederick University
- Occupation: literary historian
- Employer: University of Oslo
- Children: Eystein Paasche
- Relatives: Olaf Amundsen (brother); Hugo E. G. Hamilton, father-in-law
- Awards: King's Medal of Merit (1922)

Johan Fredrik Paasche (born Amundsen; 3 February 1886 – 1 September 1943) was a Norwegian educator, author and literary historian.

== Biography ==
Johan Fredrik Amundsen was born in Bindal Municipality in Nordland county, Norway. He was the son of Olaf Kristian Amundsen (1850–1910) and Kirsten Birgitte Paasche (1850–1915). His brother Olaf Amundsen served as County Governor of Nordland. In 1905, he took his mother's surname, Paasche.

He graduated from the University of Oslo in 1910. In 1916, he traveled to Germany where he was a war correspondent. He was appointed a professor of European literature in 1920 at the University of Oslo and professor of Middle Age literature from 1938 until 1940. He relocated to Sweden following the German invasion of Norway. From 1941 onward, he was affiliated with Uppsala University, where he received an honorary doctorate in theology.

He co-edited the series Norsk litteraturhistorie, planned jointly with Francis Bull from 1911. He wrote volume one (on Norway's and Iceland's literature until the end of the Middle Ages, published from 1923 to 1926) and volume three (on Norwegian literature from 1814 to the 1850s, published from 1927 to 1932). In 1922, he was awarded the King's Medal of Merit (Kongens Fortjenstmedalje).

His other books include Gildet paa Solhaug. Ibsens nationalromantiske digtning (1908), Luther (1917), Goethe (1918), Kong Sverre (1920), Snorre Sturlason og Sturlungerne (1922) and Landet med de mørke skibene (1938).

He was married twice, each time to a Swedish woman. In 1916, he married Agnes Viveka Aimée Hamilton (1891–1917), a daughter of Count Hugo E. G. Hamilton. In 1928, he married Eva Kristina Mörner (1889–1992). He died in Uppsala, Sweden and was buried at Vår Frelsers gravlund in Oslo.
