= Raphael Basch =

Austrian politician and writer (1813–1907)

Raphael Basch, also Rafael Basch (1813 – 22 January 1907) was a Bohemian-Austrian writer and politician. He was the adoptive father of Victor Basch (1863–1944).

== Biography ==
Basch was born in 1813 in Prague, then part of the Austrian Empire. After the first disturbances leading to the Revolution of 1848, he went to Vienna and took an active part in the insurrection. There he founded the Reichstagblatt, which he continued at Kroměříž until the dissolution of the Constitutional Assembly in March 1849. He then joined the staff of the Österreichische Post of Vienna, which he represented at Berlin; later he served as the Paris correspondent for several newspapers. In 1855 he returned to Vienna, where he edited the Oesterreichische Zeitung, serving as official spokesman for Karl Ludwig von Bruck against Alexander von Bach’s policies that curtailed freedom of the press and empowered the Catholic Church to control education and family life. After Austria's emperor Franz Joseph promulgated a new constitution in 1861, Basch acted in a similar capacity for the Anton von Schmerling ministry, with whose political party he remained connected until its fall.

Until 1875 Basch was engaged only in economic questions, but in that year he returned to political journalism. He represented the Neue Freie Presse at Paris; and, in close fellowship with Adolphe Thiers, Léon Gambetta, and Jules Barthélemy-Saint-Hilaire, he defended the republican policy against the men of 16 May.

Basch died on 22 January 1907 in Paris.

== Literary works ==
He has published a number of political pamphlets;

Two of these, entitled Deutschland, Oesterreich, und Europa, and Oesterreich und das Nationalitätenrecht, Stuttgart, 1870 — which appeared under the pseudonym Ein Altoesterreicher — created on their appearance a great sensation in Austria.
