= Eystein Paasche =

Norwegian botanist

Eystein Karl Mørner Paasche (17 September 1932 – 27 November 2016) was a Norwegian botanist.

He was born in Bærum as a son of literary historian Johan Fredrik Paasche. He was appointed professor of marine botany at the University of Oslo in 1973. He was a fellow of the Norwegian Academy of Science and Letters.

His wife Rosamaria Alegría Paasche, "Rosita", died the next day.
