= Anna-Maria Borissova =

Bulgarian endocrinologist, professor, Minister of Health (born 1950)

Ministry of Health of Bulgaria
- In office 21 April 2010 – 29 September 2010

Personal details
- Born: January 7, 1950 (age 76) Byala Slatina, Bulgaria

Anna-Maria Borissova Ivanova (Bulgarian: Анна-Мария Борисова Иванова; 7 January 1950, Byala Slatina, Bulgaria) is a Bulgarian endocrinologist, professor, Minister of Health in the government of Boyko Borisov between 7 April and 29 September 2010. President of the Bulgarian Society of Endocrinology and the Bulgarian League for the Prevention of Osteoporosis.

== Biography ==
She was born on 7 January 1950 in Byala Slatina, Bulgaria. She enrolled in medicine at the Medical Academy, Sofia in 1968 and graduated in 1974.

She started working as an internist at the District Hospital, Lovech. In 1980 she acquired a specialty in internal medicine, in 1982 a specialty in endocrinology, and in 1987 she became a Doctor of Medicine. Since 2005 she has been a Doctor of Medical Sciences. Since 2006 she has been a professor, head of the Clinic of Thyroid and Metabolic Bone Diseases, Clinical Center of Endocrinology, Medical University, Sofia.

She has participated in more than 10 clinical studies – in 7 of them as principal investigator.

=== Political career ===
On 29 September 2010. Anna-Maria Borissova resigned, which was accepted without objection by Prime Minister Boyko Borissov. The reason for the resignation was Anna-Maria Borisova's idea for patients to pay extra for all medical services. The concept in question is the reason for the opposition to request a vote of no confidence in the government.

== Literature ==
- Shinkov, Alexander; Borissova, Anna-Maria; Kovatcheva, Roussanka; Vlahov, Jordan; Dakovska, Lilia; Atanassova, Iliana; Vukov, Mirtcho; Aslanova, Nina (1 December 2013). "Thyroid dysfunction and cardiovascular risk factors in Bulgarian adults". Open Medicine. 8 (6): 742–748. doi:10.2478/s11536-013-0235-9. ISSN 2391-5463.
