= Pasch's axiom =

Statement in plane geometry

In geometry, Pasch's axiom is a statement in plane geometry, used implicitly by Euclid, which cannot be derived from the postulates as Euclid gave them. Its essential role was discovered by Moritz Pasch in 1882.

== Statement ==
Two lines (in black) meeting a triangle side internally and meeting the other sides internally and externally

The axiom states that,

Pasch's axiom—Let A, B, C be three points that do not lie on a line and let a be a line in the plane ABC which does not meet any of the points A, B, C. If the line a passes through a point of the segment AB, it also passes through a point of the segment AC, or through a point of segment BC.

The fact that segments AC and BC are not both intersected by the line a is proved in Supplement I,1, which was written by P. Bernays.

A more modern version of this axiom is as follows:

A more modern version of Pasch's axiom—In the plane, if a line intersects one side of a triangle internally then it intersects precisely one other side internally and the third side externally, if it does not pass through a vertex of the triangle.

(In case the third side is parallel to our line, we count an "intersection at infinity" as external.) A more informal version of the axiom is often seen:

A more informal version of Pasch's axiom—If a line, not passing through any vertex of a triangle, meets one side of the triangle then it meets another side.

== History ==
Pasch published this axiom in 1882, and showed that Euclid's axioms were incomplete. The axiom was part of Pasch's approach to introducing the concept of order into plane geometry.

== Equivalences ==
In other treatments of elementary geometry, using different sets of axioms, Pasch's axiom can be proved as a theorem; it is a consequence of the plane separation axiom when that is taken as one of the axioms. Hilbert uses Pasch's axiom in his axiomatic treatment of Euclidean geometry. Given the remaining axioms in Hilbert's system, it can be shown that Pasch's axiom is logically equivalent to the plane separation axiom.

== Hilbert's use of Pasch's axiom ==
David Hilbert uses Pasch's axiom in his book Foundations of Geometry which provides an axiomatic basis for Euclidean geometry. Depending upon the edition, it is numbered either II.4 or II.5. His statement is given above.

In Hilbert's treatment, this axiom appears in the section concerning axioms of order and is referred to as a plane axiom of order. Since he does not phrase the axiom in terms of the sides of a triangle (considered as lines rather than line segments) there is no need to talk about internal and external intersections of the line a with the sides of the triangle ABC.

== Caveats ==
Pasch's axiom is distinct from Pasch's theorem which is a statement about the order of four points on a line. However, in literature there are many instances where Pasch's axiom is referred to as Pasch's theorem. A notable instance of this is Greenberg (1974, p. 67).

Pasch's axiom should not be confused with the Veblen-Young axiom for projective geometry, which may be stated as:

Veblen-Young axiom for projective geometry— If a line intersects two sides of a triangle, then it also intersects the third side.

There is no mention of internal and external intersections in the statement of the Veblen-Young axiom which is only concerned with the incidence property of the lines meeting. In projective geometry the concept of betweeness (required to define internal and external) is not valid and all lines meet (so the issue of parallel lines does not arise).
