= Donald Malcolm McRae =

Canadian lawyer

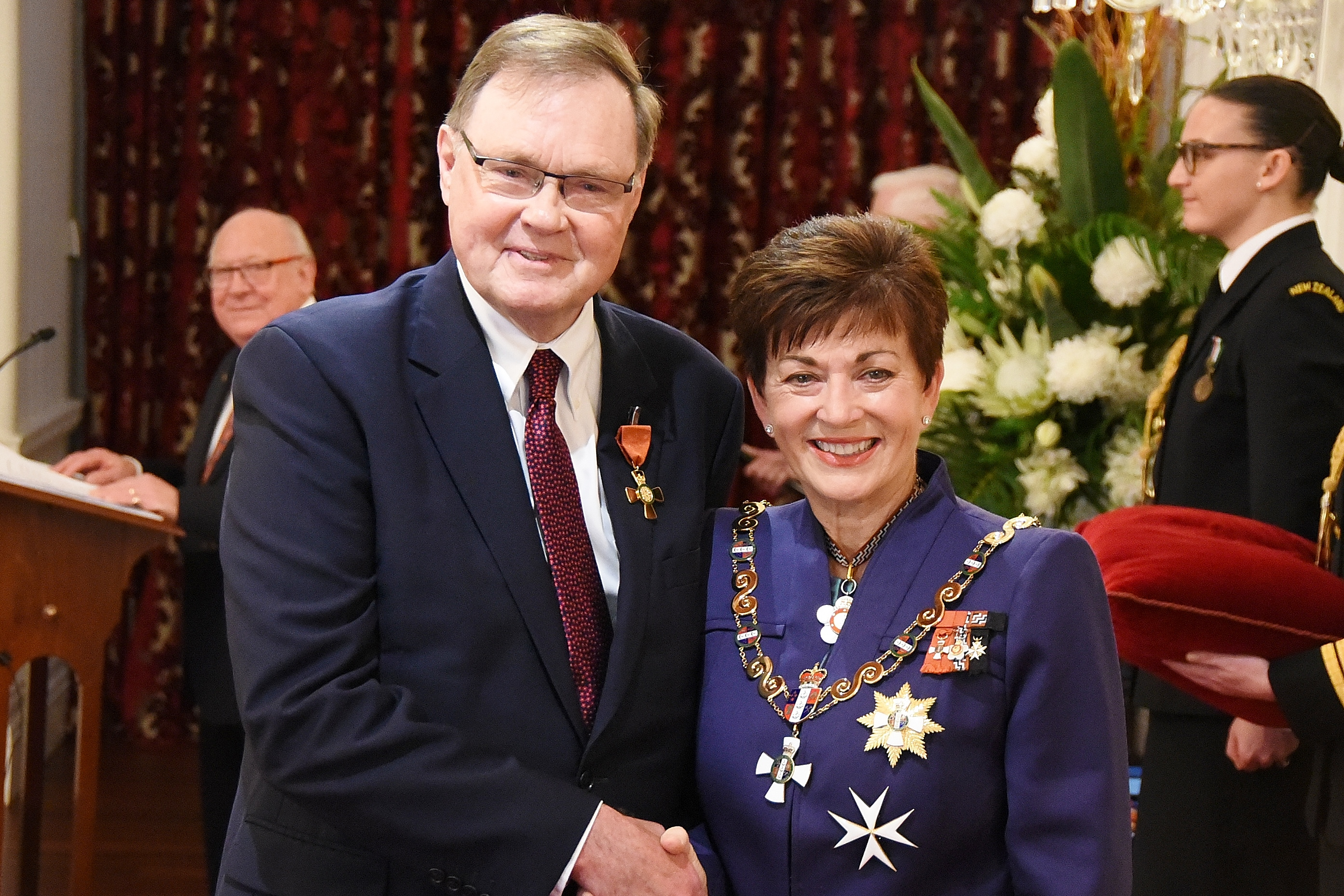
McRae in 2017, following his investiture as an Officer of the New Zealand Order of Merit by the New Zealand governor-general, Dame Patsy Reddy

Donald Malcolm McRae, CC, ONZM, FRSC, (born 1944) is a Canadian-New Zealand legal scholar at the University of Ottawa. McRae was born in Napier, New Zealand in 1944. McRae was previously the professor of law at the University of British Columbia. He was selected as a panel judge for the first Canada–United States Free Trade Agreement and Israel–United States Free Trade Agreement discussion panels. McRae has authored several books relating to fisheries, oceans and international law. McRae was appointed by governor general David Lloyd Johnston as a companion of the Order of Canada on 26 December 2014. He was appointed an officer of the New Zealand Order of Merit in 2017 New Years Honours List.
