= Norman Marcon =

Canadian gastroenterologists (born 1937)

Professor Norman Marcon FRCPC OC
- Born: Norman Emilio Marcon; 2 May 1937 (age 89); Copper Cliff, Sudbury, Ontario
- Citizenship: Canadian
- Education: Queen's University (MD)
- Known for: Therapeutic endoscopy
- Awards: Order of Canada (2014)
- Scientific career
- Fields: Medicine
- Workplaces: University of Toronto; Wellesley Hospital; St. Michael's Hospital

Norman Emilio Marcon MD,FRCPC,OC retired as a Gastroenterologist from St. Michael's Hospital, Unity Health Toronto and as a Professor of Medicine at The University of Toronto. Dr.Marcon was one of the first Gastroenterologists in Canada to use therapeutic endoscopy for the treatment of digestive diseases.

After receiving his MD at Queen's University in 1962, he continued his specialist training at The University of Toronto, St. Michael's Hospital in Internal Medicine, he specialized in Gastroenterology at The Harvard Medical Unit, Boston City Hospital. His further advanced medical training was at St Mark's Hospital-Imperial College London. Hired by Dr. Arthur Squires, he began his practice at the Wellesley Hospital in Toronto where he served as the Division Chief for over 30 years.

He developed and directed the first training program in therapeutic endoscopy in Canada. He also developed one of the first courses in therapeutic endoscopy, with the top Gastroenterologic faculty worldwide, to demonstrate, initially via satellite, live advanced cases in endoscopy for other Gastroenterologists around the world. The course is now in its 37th year, as of 2026.

His research has included the application of optical coherence tomography to Gastroenterology and therapies for dysplasia in Barrett's esophagus.

Dr.Marcon was named an Officer of the Order of Canada in 2014. Dr.Marcon retired in 2020.
