= Anna of Austria =

Anna of Austria may refer to:

- Anna of Austria (1275–1327), daughter of Albert I, Duke of Austria; wife of Margrave Hermann of Brandenburg-Salzwedel & Henry VI, Duke of Breslau
- Anna of Austria (1318–1343), daughter of Frederick I of Austria and Isabella of Aragon, niece of previous
- Anne, Duchess of Luxembourg (1432–1462), eldest daughter of Albert V, Duke of Austria and wife of William III, Duke of Luxembourg
- Anna of Bohemia and Hungary (1503–1547), only daughter of Vladislaus II of Bohemia and Hungary and wife of Archduke Ferdinand I of Austria
- Archduchess Anna of Austria (1528–1590), daughter of Ferdinand I, Holy Roman Emperor and Anna of Bohemia and Hungary; wife of Albert V, Duke of Bavaria
- Anna of Austria, Queen of Spain (1549–1580), daughter of Maximilian II, Holy Roman Emperor and fourth wife of Philip II of Spain
- Anne of Austria, Queen of Poland (1573–1598), daughter of Charles II, Archduke of Inner Austria and wife of King Sigismund III Vasa
- Anna of Austria-Tirol (1585–1618), daughter of Ferdinand II, Archduke of Further Austria and wife of Matthias, Holy Roman Emperor, king of Bohemia
- Anne of Austria (1601–1666), daughter of King Philip III of Spain and wife of King Louis XIII of France
