= Pasch (surname) =

Origin
- Origin: Old Norse, Middle High German
- Region of origin: Northern Europe

Other names
- Variant form: Basch

Pasch is a German and Swedish surname. Notable people with the surname include:

- Dave Pasch, sports broadcaster
- Erich Pasch, German sprint canoeist
- G.B.S. Pasch (1916-1960), South African minister and author
- Gustaf Erik Pasch, Swedish inventor
- Johan Pasch, Swedish painter
- Lorens Pasch the Younger (1733–1805), Swedish painter
- Lorens Pasch the Elder (1702–1766), Swedish painter
- Moritz Pasch (1843–1930), German mathematician
- Sandy Pasch, American politician
- Ulrika Pasch (1735–1796), Swedish painter and miniaturist

== See also ==
- Basch
- Pascha (disambiguation)
- Pasch's theorem
- Passover
