= Anna Maria Tarantola =

Italian manager and bank director

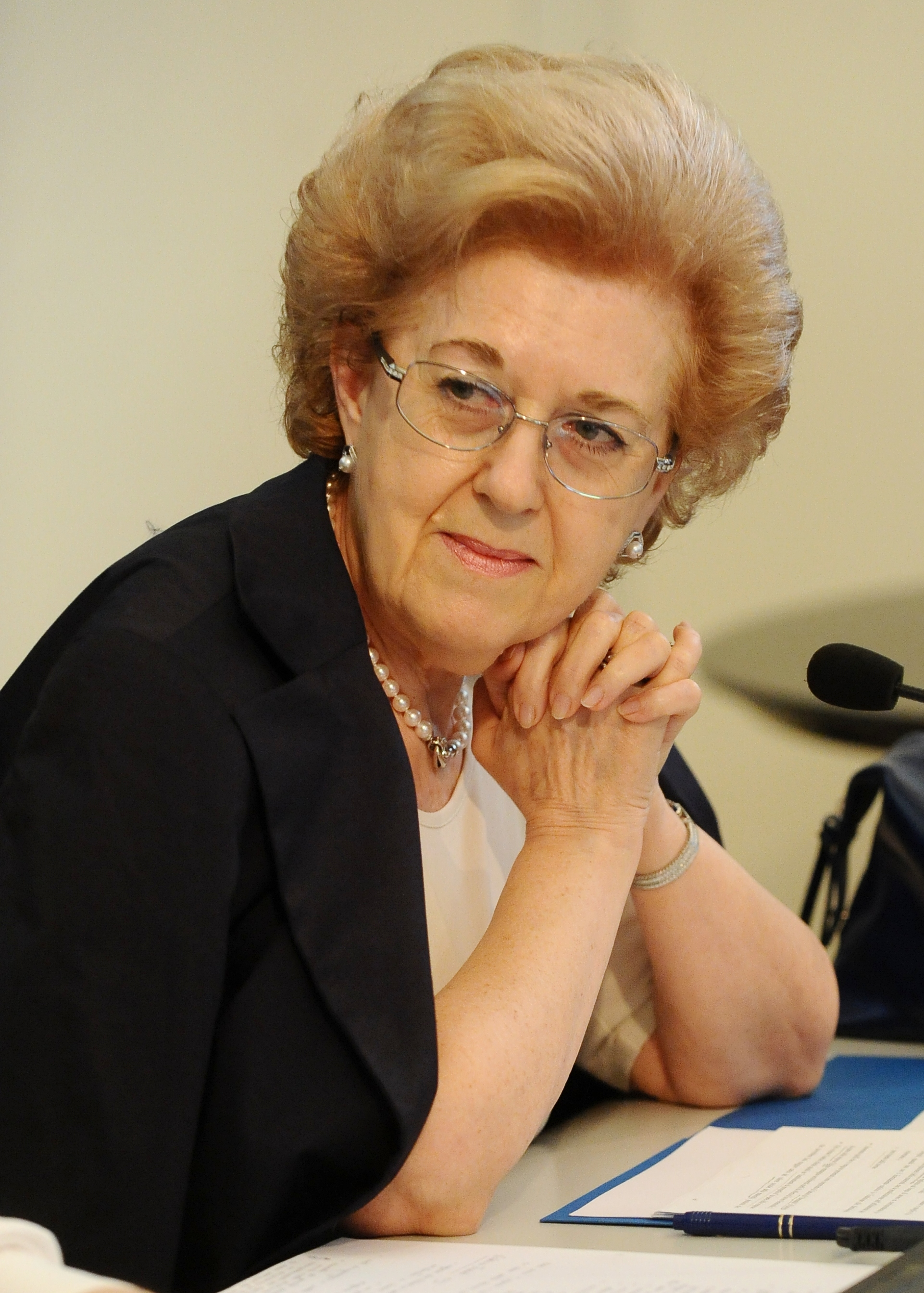
Anna Maria Tarantola in 2012

Anna Maria Tarantola (Casalpusterlengo, February 3, 1945) is an Italian manager, former director of the Bank of Italy and former President of Rai since 8 June 2012 to 5 August 2015.

She graduated in economics from the Università Cattolica del Sacro Cuore in 1969 and continued her studies at the London School of Economics obtaining a master's.

Anna Maria Tarantola is involved with the Pontifical Foundation Centesimus Annus Pro Pontifice (CAPP), based in the Secretariat of State of the Holy See; she has been President of this foundation since 2019.
