= Evert Basch =

American engineer

Evert Basch, from Verizon Inc., was named Fellow of the Institute of Electrical and Electronics Engineers (IEEE) in 2014 for advancing the deployment of fiber-optic communication systems in carrier networks.
