= Moritz Pasch =

German mathematician (1843–1930)

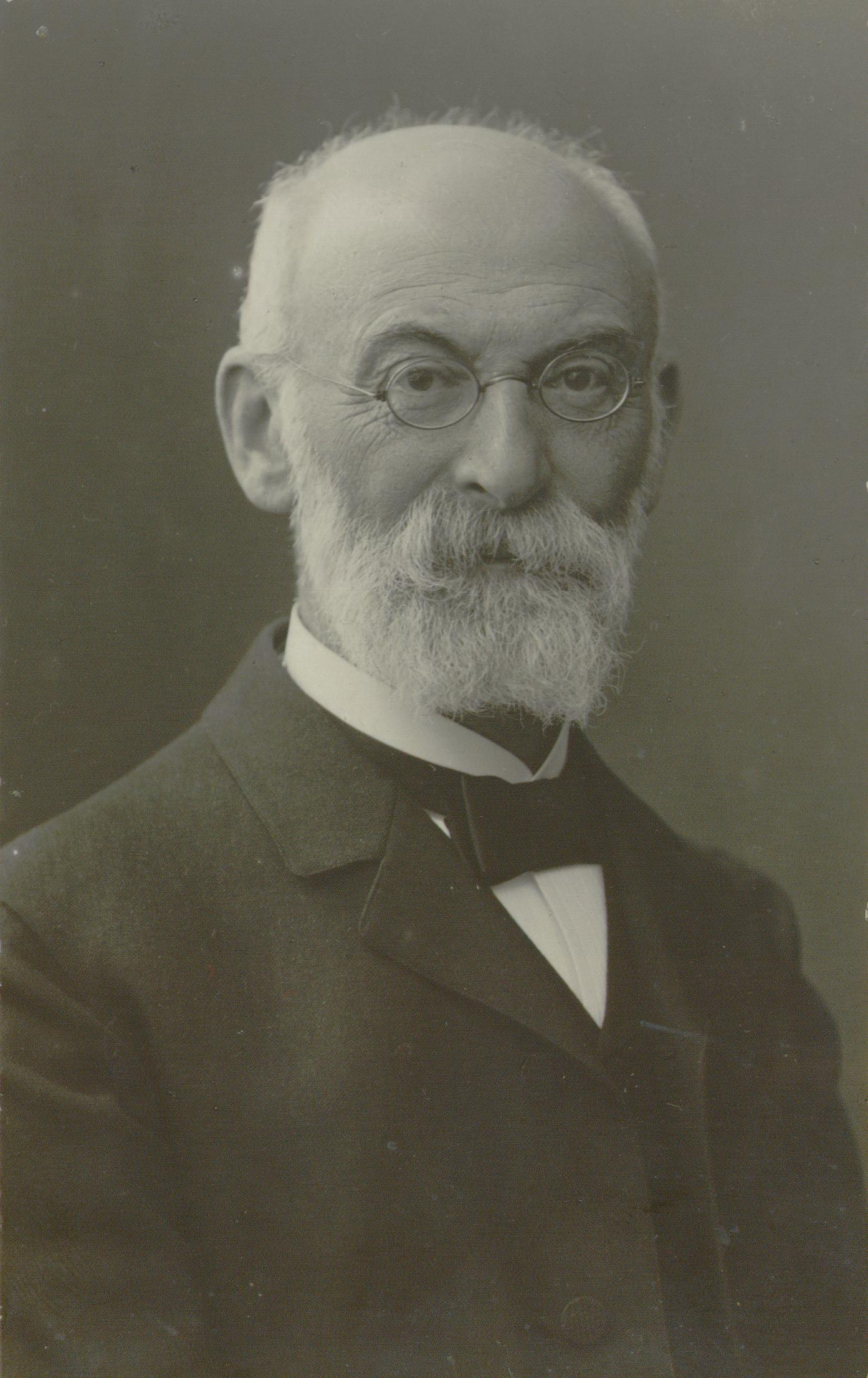
Moritz Pasch

Moritz Pasch (8 November 1843, Breslau, Prussia (now Wrocław, Poland) – 20 September 1930, Bad Homburg, Germany) was a German mathematician of Jewish ancestry specializing in the foundations of geometry. He completed his Ph.D. at the University of Breslau at only 22 years of age. He taught at the University of Giessen, where he is known to have supervised 30 doctorates.

== Works ==
In 1882, Pasch published a book, Vorlesungen über neuere Geometrie, calling for the grounding of Euclidean geometry in more precise primitive notions and axioms, and for greater care in the deductive methods employed to develop the subject. He drew attention to a number of heretofore unnoted tacit assumptions in Euclid's Elements. He then argued that mathematical reasoning should not invoke the physical interpretation of the primitive terms, but should instead rely solely on formal manipulations justified by axioms. This book is the point of departure for:

- Similarly concerned Italians: Giuseppe Peano, Mario Pieri, Alessandro Padoa
- Hilbert's work on geometry and mathematical axiomatics in general;
- All modern thinking about the foundations of Euclidean geometry.

Pasch is perhaps best remembered for Pasch's axiom:

Given three noncollinear points a, b, c and a line X not containing any of these points, if X includes a point between a and b, then X also includes one and only one of the following: a point between a and c, or a point between b and c.

In other words, if a line crosses one side of a triangle, that line must also cross one of the two remaining sides of the same triangle. Pasch's axiom is not to be confused with Pasch's theorem.

== Selected publications ==
- Vorlesungen über neuere Geometrie, Leipzig 1882; 2nd edition. 1926.
- Einleitung in die Differential- und Integralrechnung, Leipzig 1882
- Grundlagen der Analysis, Leipzig, 1908
- Mathematik und Logik, Leipzig, 1919
- Die Begriffsswelt des Mathematikers in der Vorhalll der Geometrie, Leipzig, 1922

=== Translations ===
- Pasch, Moritz (2010). Pollard, Stephen Randall (ed.). Essays on the Foundations of Mathematics. Springer. ISBN 9789048194162.

== See also ==
- Pasch's theorem
- Pasch's axiom
- Pasch configuration
- Pasch hypergraph
- Ordered geometry
