= Victor Basch =

French politician

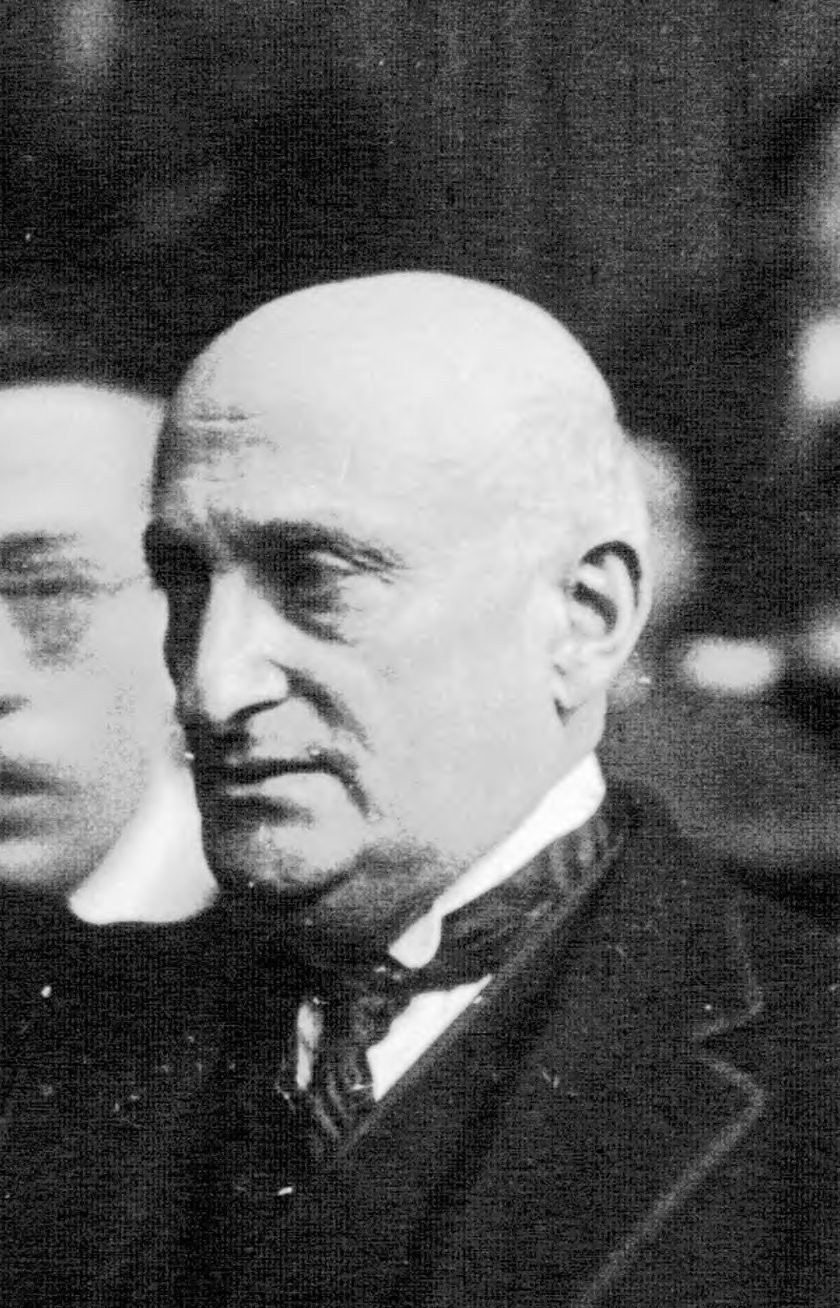
Victor Basch (1926).

Basch Viktor Vilém, or Victor-Guillaume Basch (18 August 1863/1865, Budapest – 10 January 1944) was a French Jewish politician and professor of germanistics and philosophy at the Sorbonne descending from Hungary. He was engaged in the Zionist movement, in the Ligue des droits de l'homme (president from 1926 to 1944) and in Anti-Nazism.

== Biography ==
His father was the journalist and political activist, Raphael Basch. Born in Budapest in 1863, Victor Basch emigrated with his family to France as a child, and later studied at the Sorbonne. In 1885 he was appointed professor at the University of Nancy, and in 1887 at the University of Rennes, where he became friend with Jean Jaurès. During the Dreyfus affair Basch was the leader of the Dreyfusards at Rennes, who were placed in a serious and difficult position when the case was tried in that city. Both as a Jew and a Dreyfusard, Basch was subjected to persecution at the hands of the fanatical anti-Semitic populace. In a 1916 interview cited by his biographer and granddaughter, the French historian Françoise Basch, Victor Basch declared, " I'm really a Jew. I struggle and suffered for my Jewishness." However, biographer Françoise Basch underscores that her grandfather identified with his family history and the suffering of persecuted Jews, and not with Judaism as a religion. As both a member of the League against Imperialism created in Brussels in 1927, and as President of the Ligue des Droits de l'Homme from 1926–1944, Basch was one of the architects of the Popular Front. He fought and suffered for the principles of legal and social justice as well as human rights.

On 10 January 1944, Victor Basch and his wife, Ilona Basch (née Helene Furth) aged 81, were taken from their home in Lyon and assassinated by Joseph Lecussan and Henri Gonnet of the antisemitic Vichy French Milice Française under orders of the regional chief Paul Touvier.

== Literary works ==
His published works include an important study:

- "(Essai critique sur) L'Esthétique de Kant", Paris, 1896; the first volume of a work in 4 volumes on the history of esthetics;
- "(La) Poétique de Schiller";
- "La Vie Intellectuelle à l'Etranger";
- "Les Origines de l'Individualisme Moderne"
- L'indivisualisme anarchiste, 1904
- Max Stirner, 1904
- Titian, 1927
- "Schumann, A Life of Suffering", 1931, translated from French by Catherine Alison Phillips
- Essai d'esthétique de Kant, 1936

He also contributed frequently to the "Siècle" and the "Grande Revue" of Paris.
