= Kidney Foundation of Canada =

Canadian organization that promotes organ donor awareness

The Kidney Foundation of Canada promotes organ donor awareness, and fundraises for kidney/renal research at various hospitals across Canada. They have offices in most major cities in Canada.
