= Annamaria =

Annamaria is a feminine given name. Notable people with the name include:

- Annamaria Baudena (born 1963), Italian ski mountaineer
- Annamaria Cancellieri (born 1943), Italian politician
- Annamaria Lusardi, Italian economist
- Annamaria Mazzetti (born 1988), Italian triathlete
- Annamaria Morelli, Italian film producer
- Annamaria Orla-Bukowska, Polish anthropologist
- Annamaria Prezelj (born 1997), Slovenian women's basketball player
- Annamaria Quaranta (born 1981), Italian volleyball player
- Annamaria Solazzi (born 1965), Italian beach volleyball player

== See also ==
- Anna Maria (disambiguation)
- Anamaria
- Anamarija
- Annamária, a 1943 Hungarian film
- Ana María (1929–1983), Salvadoran revolutionary
