= Maria Anna Jarochowska =

Polish-Canadian geographer, historian (1924–2018)

- Born: February 4, 1924; Silesia
- Died: 29 June 2018 (aged 94); White Rock, Canada
- Other name: Maria Anna Jarochowska-de Kosko
- Education: Adam Mickiewicz University; Adam Mickiewicz University
- Occupation: Historian academic

Maria Anna Jarochowska-de Kosko (February 4, 1924 – June 29, 2018) was a Polish-born Canadian geographer and historian. She was a researcher of Polish emigration in Canada and specialized in the contributions of Polish Canadians to Canada.

== Biography ==
Maria Anna Jarochowska was born February 4, 1924 in Silesia.

She studied political economy at Adam Mickiewicz University in Poznań, Poland, and in 1950 she defended her master's thesis there. At the same time, from 1946 she worked in a bank before moving to an economic planning office. In 1950 she started working in the library of the Poznań University of Economics, from 1953 to 1957, and she studied librarianship at the Jagiellonian University while conducting research on Polish emigration in Canada. In 1960, her publication Canada, Kraj i Ludzie (In English: (Canada, the Country and Its People), was published, for which she received a scholarship from the Canada Council for one-year postgraduate studies. In 1962 she presented her doctoral thesis at Adam Mickiewicz University and received the title of Doctor of Philosophy in the field of geographical sciences.

She attempted four times, unsuccessfully, to obtain a scientific visa (she refused to agree to cooperate with the security services), and she finally came to Canada in 1965 after receiving official permission to visit her relatives in the United States. That was when she ended her work in the library of the University of Economics.

During her stay in North America, she was offered a job as a lecturer at the University of Manitoba in Winnipeg, which she started in 1966. She was then promoted to assistant professor, a position she held until 1970, when, for health reasons, she moved to Montreal and joined the local Université du Québec. From 1984, after changing her specialization profile to the problems of emigration and assimilation in the world, she undertook scientific trips to Mexico and South Asian countries, including India, Thailand, Burma, Indonesia and the Philippines. Between 1991 and 1996, she collaborated with the Department of Anthropology at the College of William & Mary in Williamsburg, Virginia.

== Scientific achievements ==
Maria Anna Jarochowska authored three books and five academic textbooks published by the University of Quebec, and wrote dozens of articles, columns and publications that appeared in geographical journals. She was twice a guest editor in Studies in Third World Societies. On August 6, 2015, the Consul General of the Republic of Poland in Canada, Krzysztof Olendzki, awarded her the Knight's Cross of the Order of Merit of the Republic of Poland on behalf of the President of Poland.

== Personal life ==
She was married to Etienne J. de Kosko who predeceased her. While married, she used the last name Jarochowska-de Kosko.

During her last years, she lived and worked in White Rock, British Columbia, Canada. She died there on June 29, 2018.
