= Maria Anna of Bavaria =

Maria Anna of Bavaria may refer to:

- Maria Anna of Bavaria (born 1551), died 1608 who married her uncle Charles II, Archduke of Austria
- Maria Anna of Bavaria (born 1574), died 1616, who married Ferdinand II, Holy Roman Emperor, niece of the above
- Archduchess Maria Anna of Austria (born 1610), died 1655, Electress of Bavaria and daughter of the above
- Maria Anna Victoria of Bavaria (1660–1690), married Louis, Grand Dauphin of France
- Maria Anna of Bavaria, Queen of Saxony (1805-1877), who married Frederick Augustus II of Saxony
