= Pasch's theorem =

Result about 4 points on a line which cannot be derived from Euclid's postulates

In geometry, Pasch's theorem, stated in 1882 by the German mathematician Moritz Pasch, is a result in plane geometry which cannot be derived from Euclid's postulates.

== Statement ==
The statement is as follows:

Pasch's theorem—Given points a, b, c, and d on a line, if it is known that the points are ordered as (a, b, c) and (b, c, d), then it is also true that (a, b, d).

[Here, for example, (a, b, c) means that point b lies between points a and c.]

== Hilbert's use of Pasch's theorem ==
David Hilbert originally included Pasch's theorem as an axiom in his modern treatment of Euclidean geometry in The Foundations of Geometry (1899). However, it was found by E. H. Moore in 1902 that the axiom is redundant, and revised editions now list it as a theorem. Thus Pasch's theorem is also known as Hilbert's discarded axiom.

Pasch's axiom, a separate statement, is also included and remains an axiom in Hilbert's treatment.

== See also ==
- Ordered geometry
- Pasch's axiom
