= Anamarija Basch =

Yugoslav activist in the Belgian resistance and nurse in the Spanish Civil War

Anamarija Basch (Baš; c. 1893–1979), also known as Ana-Marija, was a Yugoslav activist in the Belgian resistance and a nurse in the Spanish Civil War.

== Personal life ==
Anamarija was born Ana Marija Révész, on 16 June 1893 (Note: There is disagreement as to her exact date of birth, with most sources agreeing it was in 1893. When a day is given, it is given as 16 June.) in Felsőszentiván near Baja, Hungary (Note: Some sources give Újszentiván as the place of birth.) to a family of Jewish origins. As a child she moved to Bajmok, Vojvodina. She attended school in Subotica and Budapest, Hungary, completing her secondary education at a business school in Budapest. She was married to Andrej (Andre) Baš. Together they had a son, Janoš, born in 1916, in Vienna.

She died on 25 July 1979, in Budapest.

== Political activism, Spanish Civil War and Belgian Resistance ==
After her marriage to Andrej (Endre), she moved to Subotica where she participated in the labor movement. Both Anamarija and Andrej were members of the Communist Party of Yugoslavia since 1929. They lived in Belgium from 1930, where Anamarija worked as a nurse and was an activist in the Belgian labor movement.

During the Spanish Civil War she worked as a nurse at the field hospital of the 15th Army Corps. She was one of sixteen women volunteers from Yugoslavia. After the defeat of the Spanish Republic, the family returned to Belgium, where both Anamarija and Andrej participated in the Belgian Resistance. Andrej was arrested and died in a concentration camp.

After World War II Anamarija lived in Budapest with her son.
