= Gyula Basch =

Hungarian painter (1851–1928)

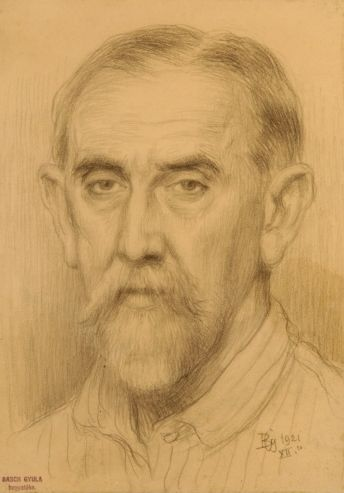
Self-portrait from 1921

Gyula Basch (April 9, 1851 – January 2, 1928) was a Hungarian painter.

Basch was born in Budapest. After completing his studies at the gymnasium, he attended the polytechnicinstitute at Zurich (1867–1872), where he obtained his diploma as engineer. He devoted himself, however, exclusively to painting, and became first a dayscholar at the École des Beaux-Arts at Paris (1873–74), and afterward a pupil of T. Paczka (1885) and of the painter L. Horovitz in Budapest (1888), finally occupying himself with genre and portrait painting. He died in Baden bei Wien.

== Works ==
His principal works are:

- "Habt Acht!"
- "Die Erste Uniform"
- "More Patrio"
- "Nie!"

Among his portraits are those of the cellist David Popper, and the Hungarian statesman Dr. Max Falk (Miksa Falk).
