= Giovanni Girolamo Saccheri =

Italian Jesuit priest, philosopher and mathematician (1667–1733)

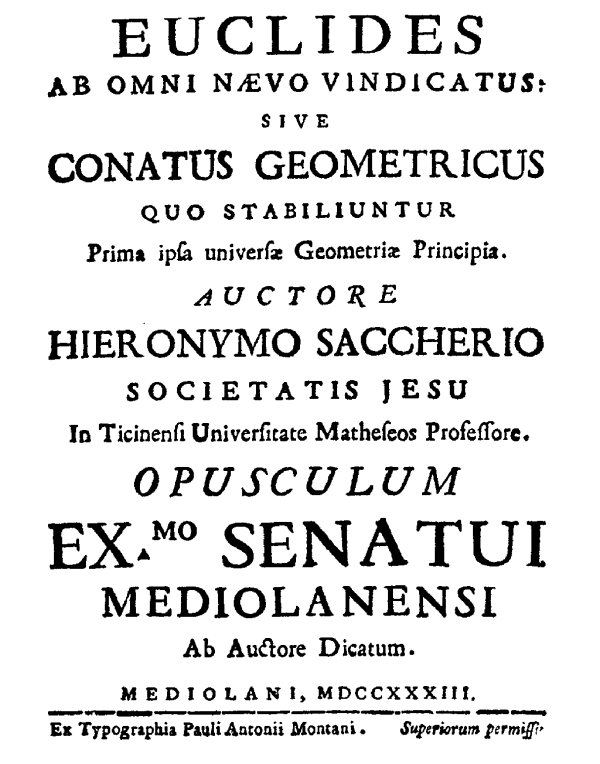
- The frontispiece of "Euclides ab omni nævo vindicatus" (1733).
- Born: September 5, 1667; San Remo, Republic of Genoa
- Died: 25 October 1733 (aged 66); Milan, Duchy of Milan
- Education: Jesuit College of Brera, Milan
- Known for: Non-Euclidean geometry Saccheri quadrilateral Saccheri–Legendre theorem
- Parent(s): Giovanni Felice Saccheri; Maria Saccheri
- Scientific career
- Fields: Mathematics; Geometry; Logic
- Workplaces: University of Turin; University of Pavia
- Notable students: Luigi Guido Grandi

Giovanni Girolamo Saccheri (Italian pronunciation: [dʒoˈvanni dʒiˈrɔːlamo sakˈkɛːri]; 5 September 1667 – 25 October 1733) was an Italian Jesuit priest, scholastic philosopher, and mathematician. He is considered the forerunner of non-Euclidean geometry.

== Biography ==
The son of a lawyer, Saccheri was born in Sanremo, Genoa (now Italy) on September 5, 1667. From his youth, he showed extreme precociousness and a spirit of inquiry. He entered the Jesuit novitiate in 1685. He studied philosophy and theology at the Jesuit College of Brera in Milan.

His mathematics teacher at the Brera college was Tommaso Ceva, who introduced him to his brother Giovanni. Ceva convinced Saccheri to devote himself to mathematical research and became the young man's mentor. Saccheri was in close scientific communion with both brothers. He used Ceva's ingenious methods in his first published work, 1693, solutions of six geometric problems proposed by the Sicilian mathematician Ruggero Ventimiglia (1670-1698).

Saccheri was ordained as a priest in March 1694. He taught philosophy at the University of Turin from 1694 to 1697 and philosophy, theology and mathematics at the University of Pavia from 1697 until his death. He published several works including Quaesita geometrica (1693), Logica demonstrativa (1697), and Neo-statica (1708). Saccheri died in Milan on 25 October 1733.

The Logica demonstrativa, reissued in Turin in 1701 and in Cologne in 1735, gives Saccheri the right to an eminent place in the history of modern logic. According to Thomas Heath “Mill’s account of the true distinction between real and nominal definitions was fully anticipated by Saccheri.”

== Geometrical work ==
Saccheri is primarily known today for his last publication, in 1733 shortly before his death. Now considered an early exploration of non-Euclidean geometry, Euclides ab omni naevo vindicatus (Euclid Freed of Every Flaw) languished in obscurity until it was rediscovered by Eugenio Beltrami, in the mid-19th century.

The intent of Saccheri's work was ostensibly to establish the validity of Euclid by means of a reductio ad absurdum proof of any alternative to Euclid's parallel postulate. To do so, he assumed that the parallel postulate was false and attempted to derive a contradiction.

Since Euclid's postulate is equivalent to the statement that the sum of the internal angles of a triangle is 180°, he considered both the hypothesis that the angles add up to more or less than 180°.

The first led to the conclusion that straight lines are finite, contradicting Euclid's second postulate. So Saccheri correctly rejected it. However, the principle is now accepted as the basis of elliptic geometry, where both the second and fifth postulates are rejected.

The second possibility turned out to be harder to refute. In fact he was unable to derive a logical contradiction and instead derived many non-intuitive results; for example that triangles have a maximum finite area and that there is an absolute unit of length. He finally concluded that: "the hypothesis of the acute angle is absolutely false; because it is repugnant to the nature of straight lines". Today, his results are theorems of hyperbolic geometry.

There is some minor argument on Saccheri's real intentions, since he came extremely close to discovering non-Euclidean geometry. Some believe Saccheri concluded as he did only to avoid the criticism that might come from seemingly illogical aspects of hyperbolic geometry.

One tool that Saccheri developed in his work (now called a Saccheri quadrilateral) has a precedent in the 11th-century Persian polymath Omar Khayyám's Discussion of Difficulties in Euclid (Risâla fî sharh mâ ashkala min musâdarât Kitâb 'Uglîdis). Khayyam, however, made no significant use of the quadrilateral, whereas Saccheri explored its consequences deeply.

== Works ==
- Quaesita geometrica (in Latin). Milano: Marc'Antonio Pandolfo Malatesta. 1693.
- Logica demonstrativa (in Latin). Pavia: eredi Carlo Francesco Magri. 1701.
- Neostatica (in Latin). Milano: Giuseppe Pandolfo Malatesta. 1708.
- Euclides ab omni naevo vindicatus (in Latin). Milano: Paolo Antonio Montani. 1733.
- Euclide liberato da ogni macchia. Testo latino a fronte; a cura di Pierangelo Frigerio, introduzione di Imre Tóth ed. Elisabetta Cattanei, Milano, Bompiani, 2001.
- Logica dimostrativa. Testo latino a fronte; a cura di Paolo Pagli e Corrado Mangione, Milano, Bompiani, 2011.

== See also ==
- Saccheri–Legendre theorem
- Hyperbolic geometry
- Parallel postulate
- Giordano Vitale
- List of Jesuit scientists
- List of Roman Catholic cleric–scientists
