= Robert Koenig =

Robert Koenig may refer to:

- Robert Koenig (filmmaker) (born 1975), American filmmaker
- Robert Koenig (sculptor) (1951–2023), English sculptor
- Robert König (1885–1979), Austrian mathematician
