= Wilhelm Klingenberg =

German mathematician

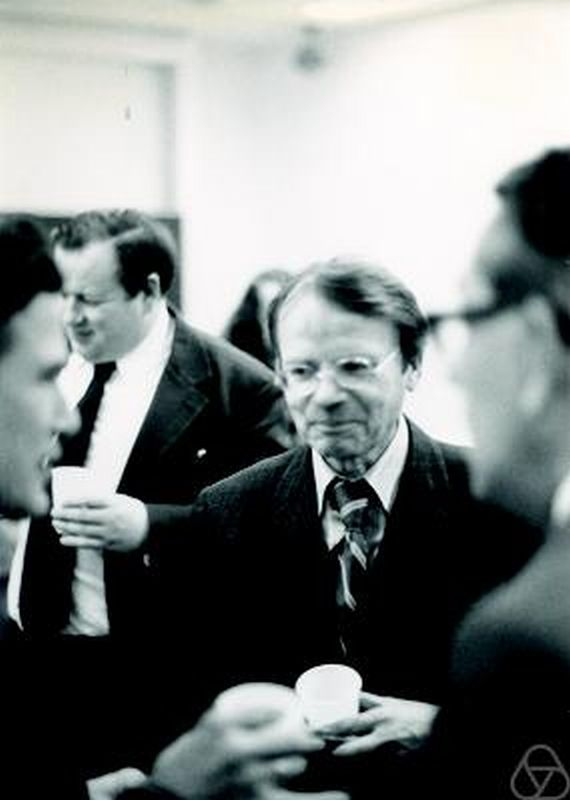
- Wilhelm Klingenberg in Erlangen in 1978
- Born: 28 January 1924; Rostock, Mecklenburg, Germany
- Died: 14 October 2010 (aged 86); Bonn, North Rhine-Westphalia, Germany
- Education: University of Kiel
- Known for: Sphere theorem
- Scientific career
- Fields: Mathematics
- Workplaces: University of Göttingen; University of Mainz; University of Bonn
- Doctoral advisor: Karl-Heinrich Weise
- Doctoral students: Hans Werner Ballmann; Ursula Hamenstädt

Wilhelm Paul Albert Klingenberg (28 January 1924 – 14 October 2010) was a German mathematician who worked on differential geometry and in particular on closed geodesics.

== Life ==
Klingenberg was born in 1924 as the son of a Protestant minister. In 1934 the family moved to Berlin; he joined the Wehrmacht in 1941. After the war, he studied mathematics at the University of Kiel, where he finished his Ph.D. in 1950 with Karl-Heinrich Weise, with a thesis in affine differential geometry.

After some time as an assistant of Friedrich Bachmann, he worked in the group of Wilhelm Blaschke at the University of Hamburg, where he defended his Habilitation in 1954. He then visited Sapienza University of Rome, working in the group of Francesco Severi and Beniamino Segre, after which he obtained a faculty position at the University of Göttingen (with Kurt Reidemeister), where he stayed until 1963.

In 1954–55 Klingenberg spent a year at Indiana University Bloomington; during this time he also visited Marston Morse at Princeton University. In 1956–58 he accepted invitations to the Institute for Advanced Study in Princeton, New Jersey. In 1962 he visited the University of California, Berkeley as a guest of Shiing-Shen Chern, who he knew from his time in Hamburg. Later he became a full (C4-) professor at the University of Mainz, and in 1966 a full (C4-) professor at the University of Bonn, a position he kept till his retirement in 1989.

Klingenberg married Christine Klingenberg née Kob in 1953 and has two sons and a daughter.

In 1966 he was an invited speaker at the quadrennial International Congress of Mathematicians in Moscow; his talk was on "Morse theory in the space of closed curves".

== Work ==
Klingenberg's area of work was geometry, especially differential geometry and Riemannian geometry. Besides many articles he published several books. One of his major achievements was the proof of the sphere theorem in joint work with Marcel Berger in 1960: The sphere theorem states that a complete, simply connected Riemannian manifold with sectional curvature contained in the interval (1, 4] is homeomorphic to the sphere.

== Publications ==
- Gromoll, Detlef; Klingenberg, Wilhelm; Meyer, Wolfgang (1968). Riemannsche Geometrie im Grossen. Lecture Notes in Mathematics. Vol. 55. Berlin-New York: Springer Verlag. MR 0229177.
- Klingenberg, Wilhelm (1978), A course in differential geometry, Berlin, New York: Springer-Verlag, ISBN 978-0-387-90255-5, MR 0474045
- Klingenberg, Wilhelm (1978), Lectures on closed geodesics, Grundlehren der Mathematischen Wissenschaften, vol. 230, Berlin, New York: Springer-Verlag, ISBN 978-3-540-08393-1, MR 0478069
- Klingenberg, Wilhelm (1982), Riemannian geometry, de Gruyter Studies in Mathematics, vol. 1, Berlin: Walter de Gruyter & Co., ISBN 978-3-11-008673-7, MR 0666697
- Klingenberg, Wilhelm P. A. (1991), Selected papers, Series in Pure Mathematics, vol. 14, River Edge, NJ: World Scientific Publishing Co. Inc., ISBN 978-981-02-0764-9, MR 1148072

== See also ==
- Global differential geometry of surfaces
