= Imre Tóth (philosopher) =

- Born: December 26, 1921; Satu Mare, Romania
- Died: May 11, 2010 (aged 88); Paris, France

Education
- Education: Babeș-Bolyai University

Philosophical work
- Era: 20th-century philosophy
- Region: Western Philosophy

Imre Tóth (December 26, 1921 – May 11, 2010) was a Romanian philosopher, mathematician and science historian, who specialized in the philosophy of mathematics. He worked on non-Euclidean geometry, mathematical irrationality, freedom, Plato and Platonism, Aristotle, Spinoza, Kant, and Hegel. He was born in Satu Mare, the year after the Treaty of Trianon recognized it as a part of Romania, to a very religious Jewish family that had fled from the 1920 pogroms. Resisting with the Communists during the Second World War and then excluded from the Party, he narrowly escaped death in the camps. After the war he studied at Babeș-Bolyai University. He died on May 11, 2010, in Paris.

== Biography ==
Tóth was the son of an official of the Habsburg army who had fought in Italy during the World War I with the twelfth Imperial-Royal Horse Artillery Regiment. His father's name was Abraham Roth, but Imre falsified his own documents, choosing "Toth" as a contrivance to escape anti-Jewish persecution, certain as he was that Roth would soon be recognised as a typically Jewish name.

He studied at a Roman Catholic high school, where he found no answer to his doubts about mathematical issues, according to him because of teachers either incompetent or hardly inclined to discuss the truly problematic aspects of those issues. This inclination of his towards such problems apparently explains why he became interested in philosophy, an interest which was to be later fostered by his father's decision to send him to the theological rabbinical seminary in Frankfurt, in order that the young scholar could so have access to the Institute's rich philosophical library. Subsequently, Imre enrolled at the King Ferdinand I University in Cluj; the teaching work of some outstanding faculty members seems to have at this stage reawakened his strong interest in mathematics.

With the World War II Imre Tóth's family was displaced, but his father had beforehand grouped together quite a few of his family's philosophical works, including the Critique of Pure Reason of Immanuel Kant, the Ethica of Baruch Spinoza, and some works by Denis Diderot and Friedrich Nietzsche. Finally, he left a letter asking that the books were not captured.

In 1940 Imre entered the underground resistance movement to the Nazis, joining a communist group: for these activities (in particular, for writing on a wall Down with fascism, down with the war, death to fascists) he was arrested and, after interrogation and torture, sentenced to death. He managed somehow to serve a mere six years in prison, and was joined there by news of the successful Operation Overlord (the Normandy landings of the Allies) on June 6, 1944, just as his deportation to Auschwitz along with the group of remaining Jewish inmates of that prison was practically underway.

During his last period of imprisonment he was injured by a guard, and hospitalized; he was forced for a while to walk with crutches. Soon did he recover, but his gait was to remain hindered for life.

As a detainee he worked out numerous reflections on The Quadrature of the Parabola, a treatise by Archimedes, laying the groundwork for future studies. Following the outcome of the war, he was awarded recognition as "the youngest working class hero in the Resistance".

After the end of conflict he took up his studies at the Babeș-Bolyai University, attending classes in mathematics and philosophy from 1945 to 1948. Later on he would teach philosophy and history of mathematics at the University of Bucharest.

In 1968 he was struck off the Romanian Communist Party, due to his harsh criticism of the government (he was accused of being an "idealist enemy", and an "agent of imperialism"), so he expatriated to Federal Republic of Germany and prosecuted his academic career teaching from 1969 to 1971 at the Goethe University Frankfurt and from 1971 to 1972 at the Ruhr University Bochum. Later until 1990 he held the chair of the History of Sciences at the Institute of Philosophy of the University of Regensburg.

Tóth gave lectures in many universities in Europe and overseas, from Frankfurt to Princeton (Institute for Advanced Study), from the Italian Institute for Philosophical Studies to the École Normale Supérieure of Paris, the city where he died.

== Works ==
- Das Parallelenproblem im Corpus Aristotelicum, in Archive for History of Exact Sciences, 3 (1967), pp. 249–422
- Non Euclidean Geometry before Euclid, in Scientific American, November 1969, pp. 87–101 (Italian translation: La geometria non euclidea prima di Euclide, Le Scienze, January 1970)
- Geometria "more ethico". Die Alternative: euklidische oder nichteuklidische Geometrie in Aristoteles und die Grundlegung der euklidischen Geometrie, in AA.VV., Prismata: Naturwissenschaftsgeschichtliche Studien, Festschrift für Willy Hartner, hrsg. von Yasukatsu Maeyama und Walter Gabriel Saltzer, Wiesbaden, Franz Steiner Verlag, 1977, pp. 395–415
- Die nicht-euklidische Geometrie in der "Phänomenologie des Geistes": wissenschaftstheoretische Betrachtungen zur Entwicklungsgeschichte der Mathematik, Frankfurt am Main, Heiderhoff, 1972
- Gott und Geometrie: Eine viktorianische Kontroverse, in Evolutionstheorie und ihre Evolution, hrsg. von Dieter Henrich, Schriftenreihe der Universität Regensburg, Band 7, 1982, pp. 141–204
- La révolution non euclidienne, in La recherche en histoire des Sciences, Paris, 1983
- Three Errors in Frege's “Grundlagen” of 1884: Frege and Non-Euclidean Geometry, in AA. VV., "Proceedings of the International Frege Conference 1984", ed. by Gerd Wechsung, Berlin, Akademie-Verlag 1984, pp. 101–108
- Mathematische Philosophie und hegelsche Dialektik, in Hegel und die Naturwissenschaften, hrsg. von Michael John Petry, Stuttgart-Bad Cannstatt, Frommann-Holzboog, 1987, pp. 89–182
- Freges mathematische Philosophie und die Mathematik zu Freges Zeit, in G. Jussen (ed.), "Tradition und Innovation", Bonn, 1987, pp. 90–92
- Essere e non essere: il teorema induttivo di Saccheri e la sua rilevanza ontologica, in: Lorenzo Magnani (ed.), Conoscenza e matematica, Milan, Marcos y Marcos, 1991
- The Dialectical Structure of Zeno's Arguments, in AA.VV., Hegel and Newtonianism, ed. by Michael John Petry, Dordrecht, Kluwer Academic Publishers, 1993, pp. 179–200
- I paradossi di Zenone nel Parmenide di Platone, Rome, L'Officina Tipografica, 1994. Repr., Naples, Bibliopolis, 2006
- Aristotele e i fondamenti assiomatici della geometria. Prolegomeni alla comprensione dei frammenti non-euclidei nel 'Corpus Aristotelicum', nel loro contesto matematico e filosofico, Milan, Vita e Pensiero, 1997
- Lo schiavo di Menone. Commentario a Platone, Menone 82B-86C, Milan, Vita e pensiero, 1998
- No! Libertà e verità, creazione e negazione. Palinsesto di parole e immagini, Ed. Francesco Spagnolo Acht, Milan, Rusconi, 1988; later, Milan, Bompiani, 2003
- De interpretatione: la geometria non-euclidea nel contesto della Oratio continua del commento ad Euclide, Naples, La città del sole, 2000
- Essere ebreo dopo l'olocausto, Fiesole (Florence), Cadmo, 2002
- Matematica ed emozioni, Rome, Di Renzo Editore, 2004
- «Deus fons veritatits»: il soggetto e la sua libertà. Il fondamento ontico della verità matematica, intervista biografico-teorica di Gaspare Polizzi, in Iride, XVII, n. 43, settembre-dicembre 2004, pp. 491–544 (English Translation: «Deus fons veritatits»: the Subject and its Freedom. The Ontic Foundation of Mathematical Truth, a biographical-theoretical interview with Gaspare Polizzi, in Iris, I, January 1 – June 2009, pp. 29–80)
- La filosofia e il suo luogo nello spazio della spiritualità occidentale, Turin, Bollati Boringhieri, 2007
- Liberté et vérité. Pensée mathématique et spéculation philosophique, Paris-Tel Aviv, Éditions de l'éclat, 2009
- Fragmente und Spuren nichteuklidischer Geometrie bei Aristoteles (Beiträge zur Altertumskunde), Berlin, De Gruyter, 2010
- Platon et l'irrationnel mathématique, Paris, Éditions de l'éclat, 2011
- La filosofia della matematica di Frege. Una restaurazione filosofica, una controrivoluzione scientifica, ed. by Teodosio Orlando, Macerata, Quodlibet, 2015
- Il lungo cammino da me a me. Interviste di Péter Várdy. Translated by Francesca Ervas, Macerata, Quodlibet, 2016
- Platon. The last, unfinished, work of Imre Tóth on Plato, edited by Romano Romani. Fiesole, Cadmo, 2020

== Bibliography ==
- Balas, Egon (2008). Will to Freedom: A Perilous Journey Through Fascism and Communism. Syracuse University Press. ISBN 978-0-8156-0930-8.
