= Tommaso Ceva =

Italian Jesuit mathematician (1648–1737)

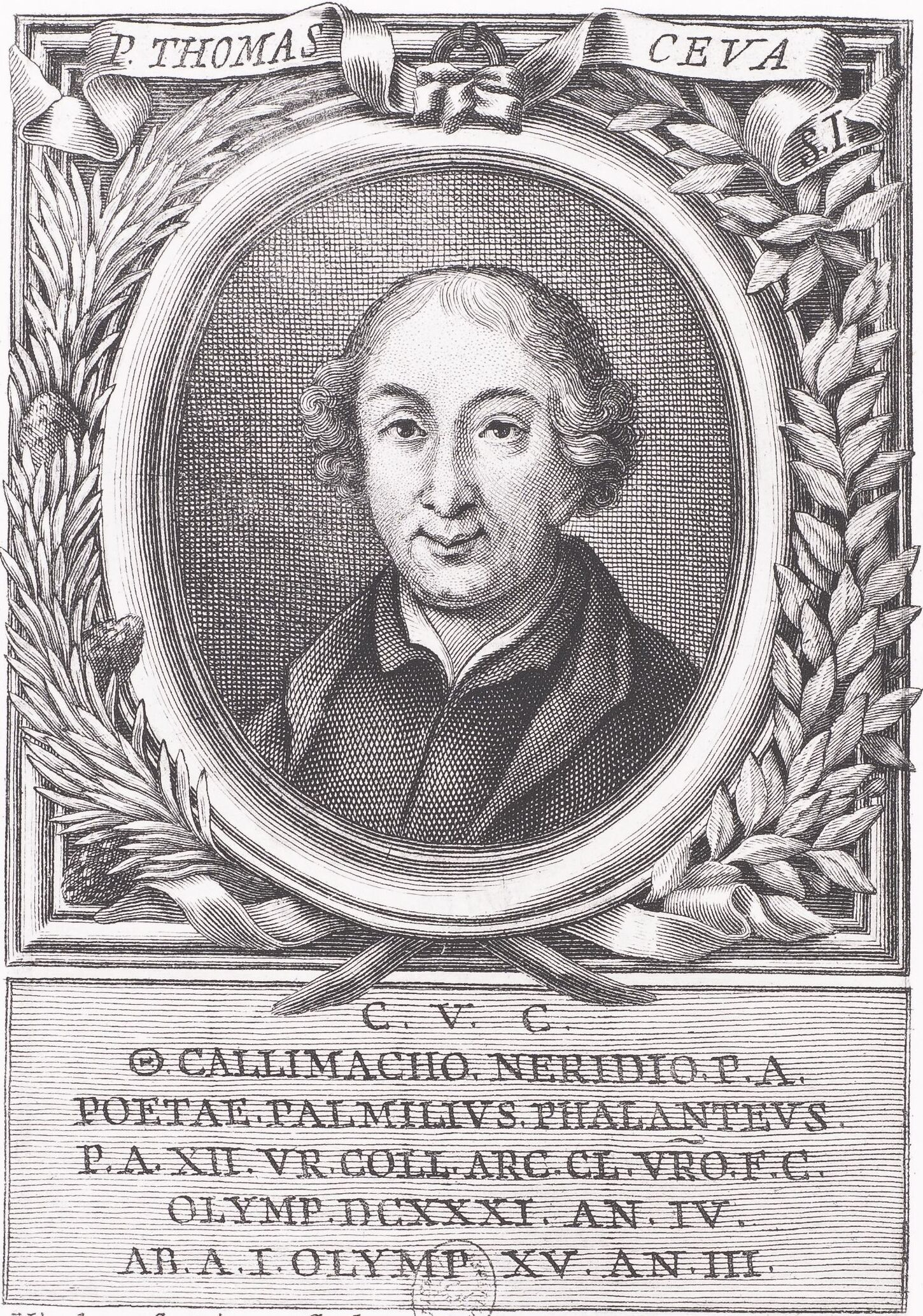
- Engraved portrait of Tommaso Ceva by Nicola Gutierrez
- Born: December 20, 1648; Milan, Duchy of Milan
- Died: February 3, 1737 (aged 88); Milan, Duchy of Milan
- Education: Jesuit College of Brera, Milan
- Occupations: Jesuit priest; Poet; Scientist
- Known for: Cycloid of Ceva
- Parent(s): Carlo Francesco Ceva and Paola Ceva (née de' Colombi)
- Relatives: Giovanni Ceva (brother)
- Scientific career
- Fields: mathematics, geometry, physics
- Workplaces: Jesuit College of Brera, Milan
- Notable students: Giovanni Girolamo Saccheri; Carlo Archinto

Tommaso Ceva (December 20, 1648 – February 3, 1737) was an Italian Jesuit mathematician from Milan. He was the brother of Giovanni Ceva. His work aided in spreading a knowledge of Newton's discovery of the law of gravitation.

== Biography ==
Tommaso Ceva was born into a wealthy Milanese family in 1648. After studying at the Collegio di Brera, a Jesuit college in Milan, on 24 March 1663 he entered the Society of Jesus. He taught mathematics and rhetoric at the Jesuit College of Brera in Milan for thirty-eight years. His most famous student was Giovanni Girolamo Saccheri. Under the tutelage of Ceva, Saccheri wrote his first work, titled Quaesita geometrica (Geometric Investigations, 1693). Ceva was one of the main representatives of Clelia Grillo Borromeo's Academia Vigilantium. Joseph I named him Caesarian Theologian early in the 18th century.

His first scientific work, De natura gravium (The Nature of Gravity, 1699), dealt with physical subjects - such as gravity and free fall - in a philosophical way. His only mathematical work, published in 1699 was the Opuscula Mathematica (Mathematical Essays), which dealt with geometry, gravity and arithmetic. Ceva designed an instrument to divide a right angle into a specified number of equal parts. His device, described in the Acta Eruditorum in 1695, won him the attention of Leibniz. This same instrument was described in 1704 by the French mathematician Guillaume de l'Hôpital.

In his Philosophia novo-antiqua (New-Ancient Philosophy, 1704) Ceva defended scholasticism against the systems Descartes and Gassendi and tried to reconcile the best of ancient and modern natural philosophy. The work comprises six dissertations, dealing with topics ranging from mathematics to cosmology and mechanics, and engages with live issues for the science of the time (Copernican theory; Descartes's physics and denial of animal souls; Gassendi's atomism). Ceva accepted Galileo's theory of motion but not his cosmology. As far as Cartesian physics is concerned, he especially criticized the identification of the essence of matter with extension. Ceva's Philosophia novo-antiqua was reissued in Wien in 1719, in Florence in 1723 and in Venice in 1732.

Ceva was also a noted poet and dedicated a significant amount of his time to this task. In the literary field Ceva shared the Arcadian reaction against marinism, and summed it up in his oft-quoted definition of poetry as ‘un sogno che si fa in presenza della ragione’ (“a dream made in the presence of reason”). His Latin poem Jesus Puer, dedicated to the Holy Roman emperor Joseph I, was translated into many languages including German and Italian. Two other collections of Latin verses, Sylvae (1699; “Woods”) and Carmina (1704; “Poems”), range over philosophic, scientific, religious, and literary subjects. Ceva was made a fellow of the Arcadia in 1718 and was in correspondence with Vincenzo Viviani and Luigi Guido Grandi. He was a close friend of the mathematician Pietro Paolo Caravaggio and his son Pietro Paolo Caravaggio junior.

His Opuscula mathematica brought him international fame and his Carmina were favourably reviewed in Acta Eruditorum. His work was highly praised by Gotthold Ephraim Lessing and Christian Friedrich Daniel Schubart.

In his latter years, Ceva suffered from paralysis. He died in Milan on 3 February 1737. The 6,5-kilometer sized main-belt asteroid 12579 Ceva, discovered at the San Vittore Observatory in 1999, was named in honor of him and his brother, Giovanni.

== The Cycloid of Ceva ==
Cycloid of Ceva

Prompted by the familiar "insertion" method of Archimedes, Ceva devised in 1699 a curve for trisection which was called the "Cycloidum anomalarum". The principle involved is that of doubling angles. The cycloid of Ceva has the polar equation

$$r=1+2\cos(2\theta)$$.

In Cartesian coordinates the equation of this curve is

$$(x^2+y^2)^3=(3x^2-y^2)^2$$.

To trisect the angle $\angle ABC$, construct a line parallel to the polar axis (the positive $x$ axis). Let $D$ be the point of intersection of the cycloid and the line. Then the angle $\angle ABD$ is one-third of the angle $\angle ABC$.

Proof: let angle $\angle ABD$ be $\theta$ and let the point $F$ on the $x$ axis be such that $|BE| = |EF| = 1$. Let $G$ be the orthogonal projection of $F$ on the line $BD$. The angle $\angle DEF = 2\theta$, so $|BG| = 1 +\cos(2\theta)$. Since $|BD| = 1 + 2\cos(2\theta)$, $|EG| = |GD|$, $|DF| = |EF| = 1$. So angle $\angle DFH$ equals $4\theta-\angle EFA=3\theta$, but $\angle DFH=\angle CBA$.

== See also ==
- List of Jesuit scientists
- List of Roman Catholic scientist-clerics

== Bibliography ==
- Lindon, J. (2002). "Ceva, Tommaso". The Oxford Companion to Italian Literature. Oxford University Press.
- Argelati, Filippo (1745). Bibliotheca scriptorum mediolanesium. Vol. 1. Milan: in Aedibus Palatinis. pp. 417–20.
- Riccardi, Pietro (1870). Biblioteca matematica italiana. Vol. 1. Modena: tipografia dell'erede Soliani. pp. 343–4.
- Gronda, Giovanna (1980). "CEVA, Tommaso". Dizionario Biografico degli Italiani (in Italian). Vol. 24: Cerreto–Chini. Rome: Istituto dell'Enciclopedia Italiana. ISBN 978-88-12-00032-6.
- Sommervogel, Carlos (1891). Bibliothèque de la Compagnie de Jésus. Vol. 2. Brusels: Oscar Schepens. pp. 1015–24.
- Alberto Pascal, L'apparecchio polisettore di Tommaso Ceva e una lettera inedita di Guido Grandi, «Rendiconti dell'Istituto Lombardo di Scienze e Lettere», s. II, 48 (1915), pp. 173–181.
- Ramat, Raffaello, "La critica del padre Ceva," Civiltà moderna, 10 (1938), 385-95, and 11 (1939), 139-66. (Reprinted in Sette contributi agli studi di storia della letteratura italiana, (Florence, 1947), pp. 5–44.
- Luigi Tenca, La corrispondenza epistolare fra Tommaso Ceva e Guido Grandi, in Rendiconti dell'Istituto lombardo di scienze e lettere, classe di scienze matematiche e naturali, LXXXIV (1951), pp. 519–537.
- Masiello, Vitilio (1959). "Critica e gusto di Tommaso Ceva". Convivium. XXVII (4): 288–313.
- Masiello, Vitilio (1960). "Le idee estetiche di Tommaso Ceva". Convivium. XXVIII (3): 298–317.
- Oettel, Herbert (1981). "Ceva, Tomasso". Dictionary of Scientific Biography. Vol. III. New York: Charles Scribner's Sons. pp. 183–184.
- Simonutti, Luisa (1989). "Guido Grandi, scienziato e polemista, e la sua controversia con Tommaso Ceva". Annali della Scuola Normale Superiore di Pisa. Classe di Lettere e Filosofia. 19 (3): 1001–1026. JSTOR 24307638.
- Ulivi, Elisabetta (1989). "Un tardo seguace di Viète, Pietro Paolo Caravaggio senior". Bollettino di Storia delle Scienze Matematiche. IX (1): 91–137. ISSN 0392-4432.
- Canziani, Guido (1997). "Descartes e Gassendi nella Philosophia Novo-antiqua di Tommaso Ceva". In Marco Beretta; Felice Mondella; Maria Teresa Monti (eds.). Per una storia critica della scienza. Bologna: Cisalpino. pp. 139–64.
- Haskell, Yasmin (2008). "Sleeping with the Enemy: Tommaso Ceva's Use and Abuse of Lucretius in the Philosophia novo-antiqua (Milan, 1704)". What Nature Does Not Teach. Disputatio. Vol. 15. Turnhout: Brepols. pp. 497–520. doi:10.1484/M.DISPUT-EB.3.3264. ISBN 978-2-503-52596-9.
- Colombo, Emanuele (2010). "Milano bilingue: il gesuita Tommaso Ceva (1648-1737)". Studia Borromaica: Saggi e documenti di storia religiosa e civile della prima età moderna. 24 (24): 77–97. doi:10.1400/252020.
