= Lambert quadrilateral =

Quadrilateral with only 3 right angles

A Lambert quadrilateral

In geometry, a Lambert quadrilateral (also known as Ibn al-Haytham–Lambert quadrilateral), is a quadrilateral in which three of its angles are right angles. Historically, the fourth angle of a Lambert quadrilateral was of considerable interest since if it could be shown to be a right angle, then the Euclidean parallel postulate could be proved as a theorem. It is now known that the type of the fourth angle depends upon the geometry in which the quadrilateral exists. In hyperbolic geometry the fourth angle is acute, in Euclidean geometry it is a right angle and in elliptic geometry it is an obtuse angle.

A Lambert quadrilateral can be constructed from a Saccheri quadrilateral by joining the midpoints of the base and summit of the Saccheri quadrilateral. This line segment is perpendicular to both the base and summit and so either half of the Saccheri quadrilateral is a Lambert quadrilateral.

== Lambert quadrilateral in hyperbolic geometry ==
In hyperbolic geometry a Lambert quadrilateral AOBF where the angles $\angle FAO , \angle AOB , \angle OBF$ are right, and F is opposite O ,$\angle AFB$ is an acute angle, and the curvature = -1 the following relations hold:

$\sinh AF = \sinh OB \cosh BF$

$\tanh AF = \cosh OA \tanh OB$

$\sinh BF = \sinh OA \cosh AF$

$\tanh BF = \cosh OB \tanh OA$

$\cosh OF = \cosh OA \cosh AF$

$\cosh OF = \cosh OB \cosh BF$

$\sin \angle AFB = \frac {\cosh OB}{ \cosh AF} = \frac {\cosh OA}{ \cosh BF }$

$\cos \angle AFB = \sinh OA \sinh OB = \tanh AF \tanh BF$

$\cot \angle AFB = \tanh OA \sinh AF = \tanh OB \sinh BF$

$\sin \angle AOF = \frac {\sinh AF}{ \sinh OF}$

$\cos \angle AOF = \frac {\tanh OA}{ \tanh OF}$

$\tan \angle AOF = \frac {\tanh AF}{ \sinh OA}$

Where $\tanh , \cosh , \sinh$ are hyperbolic functions

== Examples ==
Lambert quadrilateral fundamental domain in orbifold *p222
*3222 symmetry with 60-degree angle on one of its corners.	*4222 symmetry with 45-degree angle on one of its corners.	The limiting Lambert quadrilateral has three right angles, and one 0-degree angle with an ideal vertex at infinity, defining orbifold *∞222 symmetry.

== See also ==
- Non-Euclidean geometry
