= Aristotle's axiom =

Axiom in the foundations of geometry

Aristotle's axiom asserts that a line PQ exists which is parallel to AB but greater in length. Note that: 1) the line AB does not need to intersect OY or OX; 2) P and Q do not need to lie on the lines OY and OX, but their rays (i.e. the infinite continuation of these lines).

Aristotle's axiom is an axiom in the foundations of geometry, proposed by Aristotle in On the Heavens that states:

If $\widehat{\rm XOY}$ is an acute angle and AB is any segment, then there exists a point P on the ray $\overrightarrow{OY}$ and a point Q on the ray $\overrightarrow{OX}$, such that PQ is perpendicular to OX and PQ > AB.

Aristotle's axiom is a consequence of the Archimedean property, and the conjunction of Aristotle's axiom and the Lotschnittaxiom, which states that "Perpendiculars raised on each side of a right angle intersect", is equivalent to the Parallel Postulate.

Without the parallel postulate, Aristotle's axiom is equivalent to each of the following two incidence-geometric statements:

- Given two intersecting lines m and n, and a point P, incident with neither m nor n, there exists a line g through P which intersects m but not n.
- Given a line a as well as two intersecting lines m and n, both parallel to a, there exists a line g which intersects a and m, but not n.

== Sources ==
- Greenberg, Marvin Jay (1988), "Aristotle's axiom in the foundations of geometry", Journal of Geometry, 33 (1–2): 53–57, doi:10.1007/BF01230603, S2CID 122416844
- Greenberg, Marvin Jay (2010), "Old and new results in the foundations of elementary plane Euclidean and non-Euclidean geometries" (PDF), American Mathematical Monthly, 117 (3): 198–219, doi:10.4169/000298910x480063, S2CID 7792750
- Greenberg, Marvin Jay (2008), Euclidean and non-Euclidean geometries, 4th edition, W H Freeman
- Martin, George E. (1982), The foundations of geometry and the non-Euclidean plane, Springer
- Pambuccian, Victor (2019), "The elementary Archimedean axiom in absolute geometry (Paper No. 52)", Journal of Geometry, 110: 1–9, doi:10.1007/s00022-019-0507-x, S2CID 209943756
- Pambuccian, Victor (1994), "Zum Stufenaufbau des Parallelenaxioms", Journal of Geometry, 51 (1–2): 79–88, doi:10.1007/BF01226859, hdl:2027.42/43033, S2CID 28056805
- Pambuccian, Victor; Schacht, Celia (2021), "The ubiquitous axiom", Results in Mathematics, 76 (3): 1–39, doi:10.1007/s00025-021-01424-3, S2CID 236236967
- Pambuccian, Victor (2025), "Addenda to "The parallel postulate" (Paper No. 52)", Annali dell'Università di Ferrara. Sezione VII. Scienze Matematiche, 71: 1–3, doi:10.1007/s11565-025-00582-4
