= Karl Heinrich Weise =

German mathematician (1909–1990)

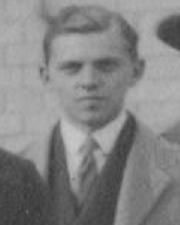
Karl-Heinrich Weise 1930 in Jena

Karl Heinrich Weise (24 May 1909, Gera – 15 April 1990, Kiel) was a German mathematician. In 1956 he was the president of the German Mathematical Society (Deutsche-Mathematiker Vereinigung, DMV).

== Biography ==
Karl-Heinrich Weise, the son of a middle school teacher, studied mathematics, astronomy, and physics from 1928 to 1930 at Leipzig University. In 1930 he matriculated at the University of Jena, where he received his doctorate in mathematics in 1934. His doctoral dissertation, supervised by Robert König, is entitled Beiträge zum Klassenproblem der quadratischen Differentialformen (Contributions to the class problem of quadratic differential forms) and was published in 1935 in Mathematische Annalen. At the University of Jena, Weise was from 1935 to 1937 wissenschaftliche Assistent and from 1937 to 1942 Privatdozent. His NSDAP-Mitgliedsnummer was 5663631. From 1940 to 1945 he held an appointment as wissenschaftlicher Mitarbeiter in Potsdam. At Kiel University, he became in November 1942 planmässiger ausserordentlicher Professor (associate professor with tenure) and in November 1945 ordentlicher Professor (full professor) becoming the successor of Adolf Hammerstein (1888–1941).

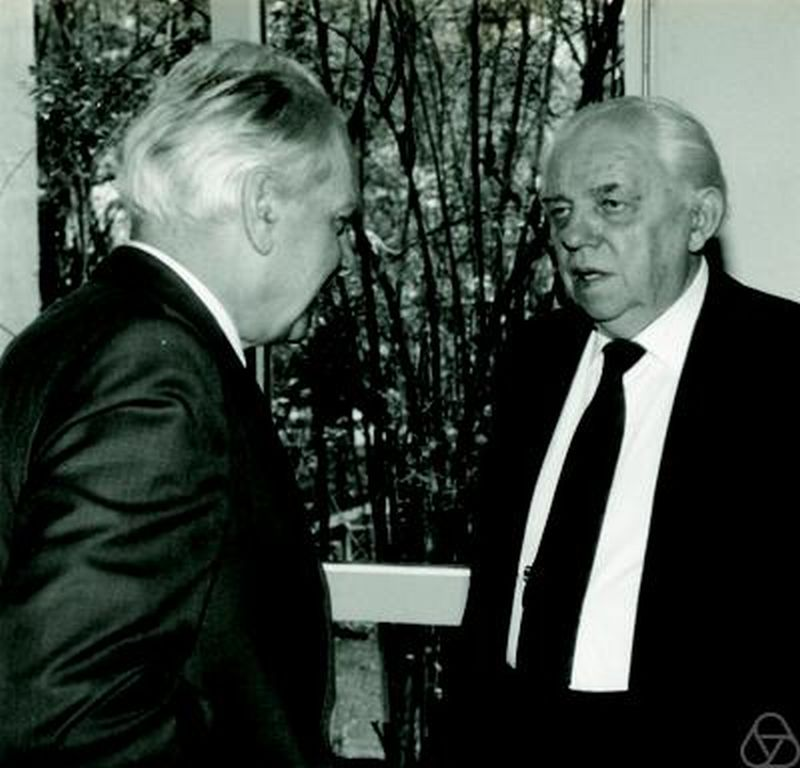
Karl-Heinrich Weise 1987 in conversation with Martin Barner

During WW II, academic lectures stopped in Kiel from 1943 to mid-1945 due to bombing raids. During the bombing, the rooms of Kiel University's Mathematisches Seminar had been completely destroyed. At the end of 1945 Weise was in charge of making a new start. The first mathematical courses were given on a ship that had escaped destruction. Weise and Friedrich Bachmann had leading roles in reestablishing mathematics in Kiel during the postwar era. Weise was the Kiel University's rector from 1952 to 1953. He was early in realizing the importance of electronic computers for applied mathematics. With the nuclear physicist Erich Bagge, he founded Kiel University's computer center. The center's first computer was a Z22 manufactured by Konrad Zuse's company Zuse KG. Later, the center acquired an X1 and an X8 from Electrologica. Weise, with an assistant, did computations on problems in knot theory. Bodo Schlender, a former doctoral student of Weise, became the Kiel University's first professor of computer science. Schlender developed computer methods for symbolic manipulations of formulas involving trigonometric functions and was a pioneer of computational group theory. The most famous of the doctoral students supervised by Weise is Wolfgang Haken (1928–2022). Haken learned about Heinrich Heesch's contributions to the Four Color Problem and enthusiastically Weise's lectures on topology. Weise described to his students the Poincaré Conjecture, the Four Colour Problem, and a problem in knot theory. Haken began an attempt to solve all three problems. His 1953 PhD thesis entitled Ein topologischer Satz über die Einbettung (d-1)-dimensionaler Mannigfaltigkeiten in d-dimensionale Mannigfaltigkeiten solved the knot theory problem described by Weise. This achievement established an international reputation for Haken. In 1976 Haken, assisted by Kenneth Appel, used computer techniques to solve the Four Color Problem. Besides Haken and Schlender, Weise's other doctoral students include Andreas Dress, Wolfgang Gaschütz, and Wilhelm Klingenberg.

Although Weise's fame rests upon his pioneering use of electronic computers in mathematics, most of his research dealt with differential geometry and topology. In 1971 he founded the Institut für Informatik und Praktische Mathematik (Institute for Informatics and Applied Mathematics), profoundly influencing computer science at Kiel. He was the institute's director from 1971 to 1977, when he retired.

In 1978 Karl-Heinrich Weise was appointed an honorary senator at Kiel University. In 1978 he was also awarded Germany's Bundesverdienstkreuz 1. Klasse. He and his wife had two children.

== Selected publication ==
- with Robert König: Mathematische Grundlagen der Kartographie (Mathematical foundations of cartography), vol. 1 Das Erdsphäroid und seine konformen Abbildungen (The Earth spheroid and its conformal images), Springer 1951.
- Gewöhnliche Differentialgleichungen (Ordinary differential equations), Wolfenbütteler Verlagsanstalt, Wolfenbüttel und Hannover 1948 (146 pages).
- Differentialgleichungen, Vandenhoeck und Ruprecht 1966 (358 pages).
