= Katharina T. Huber =

German applied mathematician and mathematical biologist

Katharina Theresia Huber (born 1965) is a German applied mathematician and mathematical biologist whose research concerns phylogenetic trees, evolutionary analysis, their mathematical foundations, and their mathematical visualization. She is an associate professor in the School of Computing Sciences at the University of East Anglia in England, and the school's director of postgraduate research.

== Education and career ==
Huber completed a doctorate in mathematics at Bielefeld University in 1997. Her dissertation, A T-theoretical Approach to Phylogenetic Analysis and Cluster Analysis, was jointly supervised by Andreas Dress and Walter Deuber.

After postdoctoral research at Massey University in New Zealand, Huber became a lecturer in mathematics at Mid Sweden University in Sundsvall, Sweden in 2000. She moved to the Department of Biometry and Engineering of the Uppsala University in Sweden in 2003, and to the School of Computing Sciences at the University of East Anglia in 2004, where she became a senior lecturer in 2012.

== Contributions ==
Huber is a coauthor of the book Basic Phylogenetic Combinatorics (Cambridge University Press, 2012), and a codeveloper of the ape package for evolutionary analysis in the R statistical programming system.

Her other research publications include:

- Holland, Barbara R.; Huber, Katharina T.; Moulton, Vincent; Lockhart, Peter J. (March 2004), "Using consensus networks to visualize contradictory evidence for species phylogeny", Molecular Biology and Evolution, 21 (7): 1459–1461, doi:10.1093/molbev/msh145, PMID 15084681
- Huber, Katharina T.; Oxelman, Bengt; Lott, Martin; Moulton, Vincent (June 2006), "Reconstructing the evolutionary history of polyploids from multilabeled trees", Molecular Biology and Evolution, 23 (9): 1784–1791, doi:10.1093/molbev/msl045, PMID 16798795
- Gambette, Philippe; Huber, Katharina T. (July 2011), "On encodings of phylogenetic networks of bounded level", Journal of Mathematical Biology, 65 (1): 157–180, arXiv:0906.4324, doi:10.1007/s00285-011-0456-y, PMID 21755321, S2CID 6880281
- Hellmuth, Marc; Hernandez-Rosales, Maribel; Huber, Katharina T.; Moulton, Vincent; Stadler, Peter F.; Wieseke, Nicolas (March 2012), "Orthology relations, symbolic ultrametrics, and cographs", Journal of Mathematical Biology, 66 (1–2): 399–420, doi:10.1007/s00285-012-0525-x, PMID 22456957, S2CID 7912961
