= Andreas Dress =

German mathematician (1938–2024)

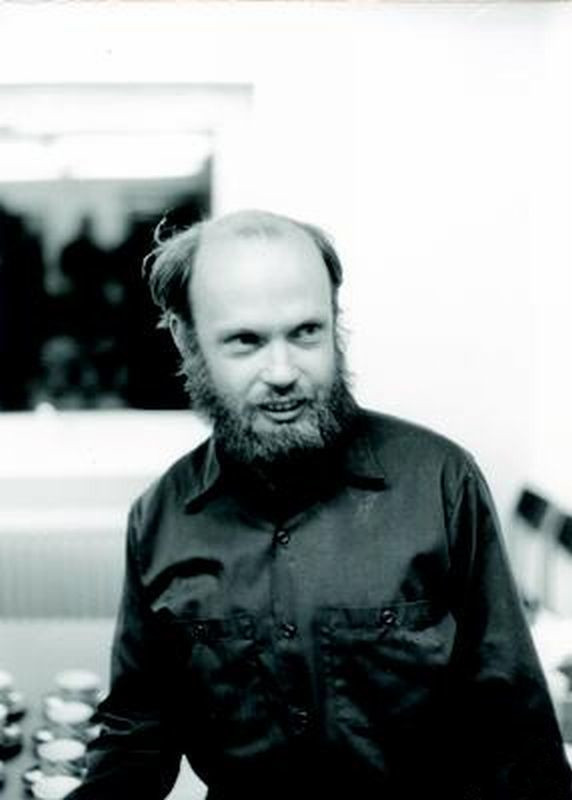
- Dress in 1976
- Born: 26 August 1938; Berlin, Germany
- Died: 23 February 2024 (aged 85)
- Education: University of Kiel (PhD)
- Scientific career
- Workplaces: Institute for Advanced Study; Bielefeld University
- Thesis: Konstruktion metrischer Ebenen (1962)
- Doctoral advisor: Friedrich Bachmann
- Doctoral students: Arndt von Haeseler; Katharina T. Huber

Andreas Dress (26 August 1938 – 23 February 2024) was a German mathematician specialising in geometry, combinatorics and mathematical biology.

== Biography ==
Dress earned his PhD from the University of Kiel in 1962, under the supervision of Friedrich Bachmann and Karl-Heinrich Weise. His thesis is entitled Konstruktion metrischer Ebenen.

Dress was a professor of mathematics at Bielefeld University beginning in 1969. He was the first director of the Max Planck Partner Institute for Computational Biology in Shanghai. In 1998 he was an Invited Speaker of the International Congress of Mathematicians in Berlin.

Dress died on 23 February 2024, at the age of 85.

== See also ==
- Split networks
- SplitsTree
- T-theory
- Tight span
