= Saccheri quadrilateral =

Quadrilateral with two equal sides perpendicular to the base

Saccheri quadrilaterals

A Saccheri quadrilateral is a quadrilateral with two equal sides perpendicular to the base. It is named after Giovanni Gerolamo Saccheri, who used it extensively in his 1733 book Euclides ab omni naevo vindicatus (Euclid freed of every flaw), an attempt to prove the parallel postulate using the method reductio ad absurdum. Such a quadrilateral is sometimes called a Khayyam–Saccheri quadrilateral to credit Persian scholar Omar Khayyam who described it in his 11th century book Risāla fī šarḥ mā aškala min muṣādarāt kitāb Uqlīdis (Explanations of the difficulties in the postulates of Euclid).

For a Saccheri quadrilateral $ABCD,$ the legs $AD$ and $BC$ are equal in length and each perpendicular to the base $AB.$ The top $CD$ is called the summit and the angles at $C$ and $D$ are called the summit angles.

The advantage of using Saccheri quadrilaterals when considering the parallel postulate is that they clearly present three mutually exclusive options: Are the summit angles right angles, obtuse angles, or acute angles?

Saccheri himself did not consider the possibility of non-Euclidean geometry and believed that both the obtuse and acute cases could be shown to be contradictory from Euclid's other postulates. He did show that the obtuse case was contradictory, but failed to properly handle the acute case.

The existence of a Saccheri quadrilateral with right angles at the summit for any base and sides is equivalent to the parallel postulate, leading to Euclidean geometry. In hyperbolic geometry, arising from the negation of the parallel postulate, the summit angles are always acute. In elliptic or spherical geometry (which require a few modifications to Euclid's other postulates), the summit angles are always obtuse.

== History ==
While the quadrilaterals are named for Saccheri, they were considered in the works of earlier mathematicians. Saccheri's first proposition states that if two equal lines $AD$ and $BC$ form equal angles with the line $AB,$ the angles at $CD$ will equal each other; a version of this statement appears in the works of the ninth century scholar Thabit ibn Qurra. Abner of Burgos's Sefer Meyasher 'Aqov (Rectifying the Curved), a 14th century treatise written in Castile, builds off the work of Thabit ibn Qurra and also contains descriptions of Saccheri quadrilaterals.

Omar Khayyam (1048-1131) described them in the late 11th century in Book I of his Explanations of the Difficulties in the Postulates of Euclid. Unlike many commentators on Euclid before and after him (including Saccheri), Khayyam was not trying to eliminate the parallel postulate but to replace with an equivalent postulate he formulated from "the principles of the Philosopher" (Aristotle):

Two convergent straight lines intersect and it is impossible for two convergent straight lines to diverge in the direction in which they converge.

Khayyam then considered the three cases right, obtuse, and acute that the summit angles of a Saccheri quadrilateral can take and after proving a number of theorems about them, he (correctly) refuted the obtuse and acute cases based on his postulate and hence derived the classic postulate of Euclid.

The 17th century Italian mathematician Giordano Vitale used the quadrilateral in his Euclide restituo (1680, 1686) to prove that if three points are equidistant on the base $AB$ and the summit $CD,$ then $AB$ and $CD$ are everywhere equidistant.

Saccheri himself based the whole of his long and ultimately flawed proof of the parallel postulate around the quadrilateral and its three cases, proving many theorems about its properties along the way.

== Saccheri quadrilaterals in hyperbolic geometry ==
Let $ABCD$ be a Saccheri quadrilateral having base $AB,$ summit $CD,$ and legs $CA$ and $DB.$ The following properties are valid in any Saccheri quadrilateral in hyperbolic geometry:

- The summit angles $C$ and $D$ are equal and acute.
- The summit is longer than the base.
- Two Saccheri quadrilaterals are congruent if:
  - the base segments and summit angles are congruent
  - the summit segments and summit angles are congruent.
- The line segment joining the midpoint of the base and the midpoint of the summit:
  - Is perpendicular to the base and the summit,
  - is the only line of symmetry of the quadrilateral,
  - is the shortest segment connecting base and summit,
  - is perpendicular to the line joining the midpoints of the sides,
  - divides the Saccheri quadrilateral into two Lambert quadrilaterals.
- The line segment joining the midpoints of the sides is not perpendicular to either side.

=== Equations ===
In the hyperbolic plane of constant curvature $-1$, the summit $s$ of a Saccheri quadrilateral can be calculated from the leg $l$ and the base $b$ using the formulas

$$\begin{align}
\cosh s &= \cosh b \cdot \cosh^2 l - \sinh^2 l \\[5mu]
\sinh \tfrac12 s &= \cosh l\, \sinh\tfrac12b
\end{align}$$

A proof is in "Wilson Stothers' Cabri Pages".

=== Tilings in the Poincaré disk model ===
Tilings of the Poincaré disk model of the hyperbolic plane exist having Saccheri quadrilaterals as fundamental domains. Besides the two right angles, these quadrilaterals have acute summit angles. The tilings exhibit a *nn22 symmetry (orbifold notation), and include:

*3322 symmetry	*∞∞22 symmetry

== See also ==
- Lambert quadrilateral
