= Pietro Paolo Caravaggio =

Italian mathematician

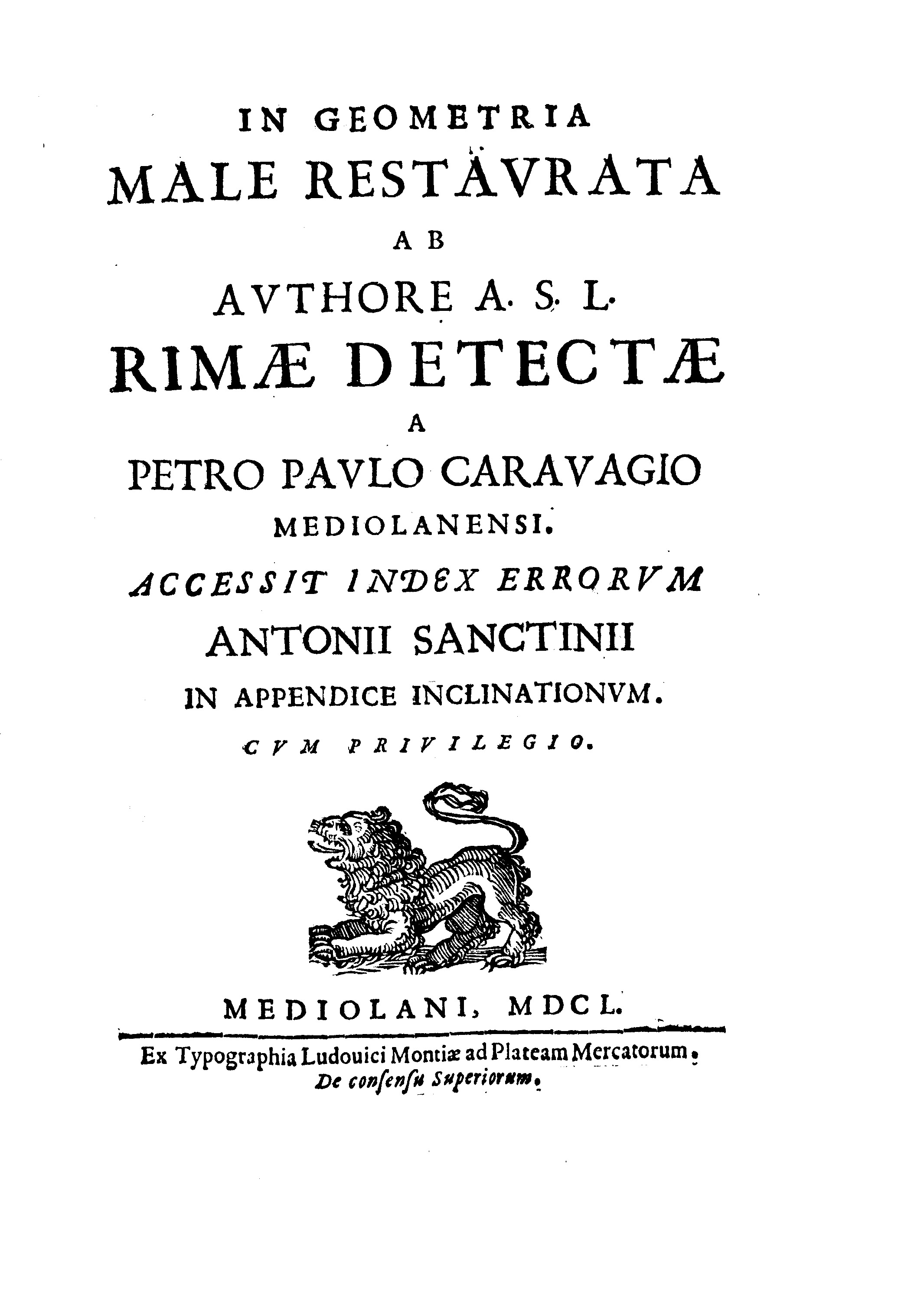
In geometria male restaurata, 1650

Pietro Paolo Caravaggio (1617 – 30 October 1688) or Petro Paulo Caravagio was an Italian mathematician.

== Life ==
Citizen of the Duchy of Milan during the Spanish domination, he was a professor of mathematics at the Palatine School and a close friend of the poet and mathematician Tommaso Ceva. He corresponded with Vincenzo Viviani, Antonio Magliabechi and Pietro Mengoli. Caravaggio is well known for the work In geometria male restaurata that he dedicated to king Philip IV of Spain, in which he introduces geometry as the queen of arts, architecture, industry, and domain of the territory.

== Works ==
- Caravaggio, Pietro Paolo (1650). In geometria male restaurata (in Latin). Mediolani: Lodovico Monza.
- Caravaggio, Pietro Paolo (1659). Geometria applicationum deficientium figura data specie (in Latin). Mediolani: ex Typographia archiepiscopali per B. Bidellium.

== Bibliography ==
- Tenca, Luigi (1953). "Relazioni tra i due Pietro-Paolo Caravaggi e Vincenzo Viviani". Rendiconti dell'Istituto Lombardo di Scienze e Lettere, Classe di Scienze. LXXXVI: 835–846.
- Ulivi, Elisabetta (1989). "Un tardo seguace di Viète, Pietro Paolo Caravaggio senior". Bollettino di Storia delle Scienze Matematiche. IX (1): 91–137. ISSN 0392-4432.
