= Ursula Hamenstädt =

German mathematician (born 1961)

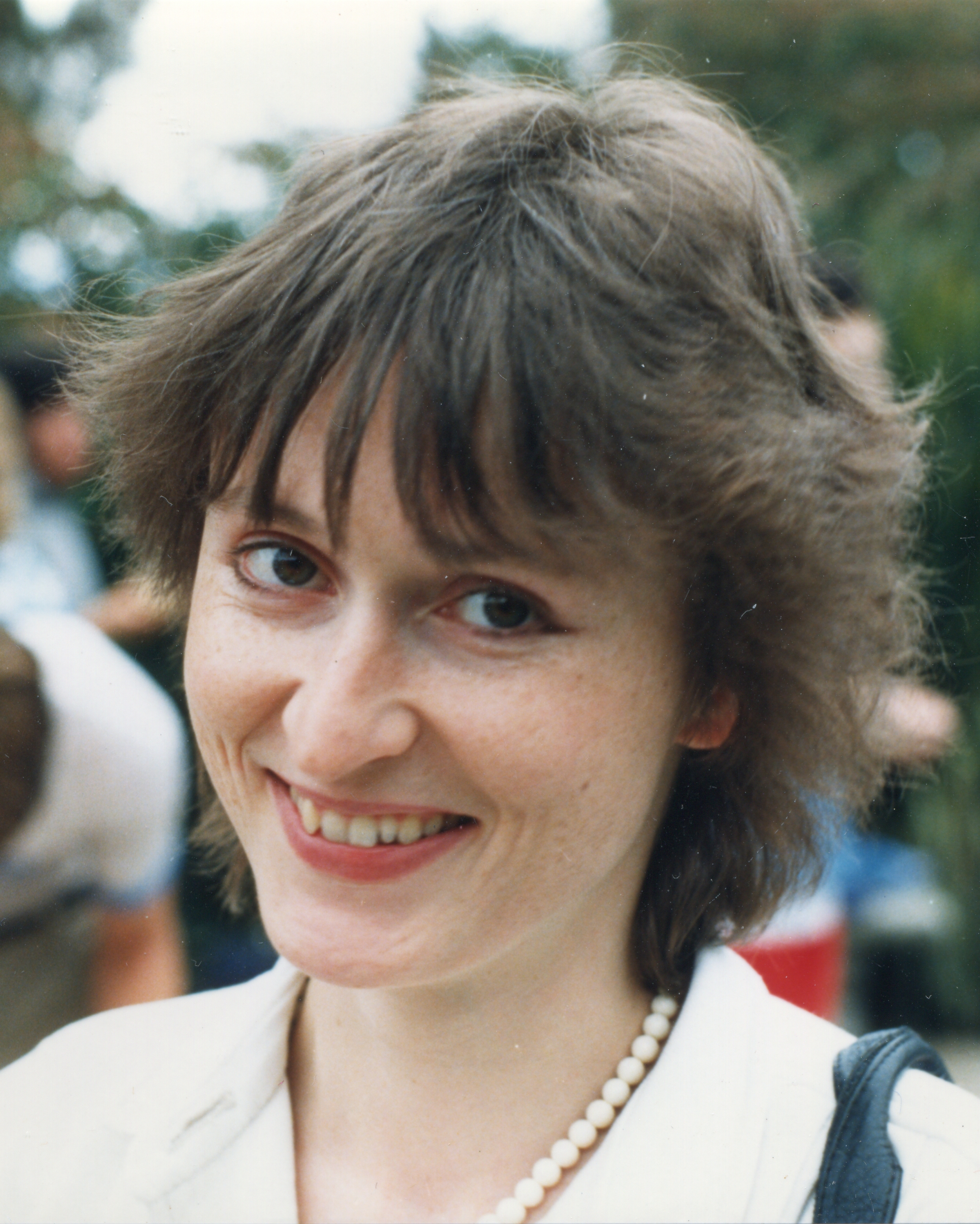
- Ursula Hamenstädt, Berkeley 1986
- Born: 15 January 1961 (age 65); Kassel, Hesse, Germany
- Education: University of Bonn; University of California, Berkeley
- Scientific career
- Fields: Mathematics
- Workplaces: University of Bonn
- Thesis: Zur Theorie der Carnot-Caratheodory Metriken und ihren Anwendungen (1986)
- Doctoral advisor: Wilhelm Klingenberg
- Website: www.math.uni-bonn.de/people/ursula/

Ursula Hamenstädt (born 15 January 1961) is a German mathematician who works as a professor at the University of Bonn. Her primary research subject is differential geometry.

== Education and career ==
Hamenstädt earned her PhD from the University of Bonn in 1986, under the supervision of Wilhelm Klingenberg. Her dissertation, Zur Theorie der Carnot-Caratheodory Metriken und ihren Anwendungen [The theory of Carnot–Caratheodory metrics and their applications], concerned the theory of sub-Riemannian manifolds.

After completing her doctorate, she became a Miller Research Fellow at the University of California, Berkeley and then an assistant professor at the California Institute of Technology before returning to Bonn as a faculty member in 1990.

== Honors ==
Hamenstädt was an invited speaker at the International Congress of Mathematicians in 2010. In 2012 she was elected to the German Academy of Sciences Leopoldina, and in the same year she became one of the inaugural fellows of the American Mathematical Society. She was the Emmy Noether Lecturer of the German Mathematical Society in 2017.

== Selected publications ==
- Hamenstädt, Ursula (2008). "Geometry of the mapping class groups I: Boundary amenability". Inventiones Mathematicae. 175 (3): 545–609. arXiv:math/0510116. Bibcode:2009InMat.175..545H. doi:10.1007/s00222-008-0158-2. ISSN 0020-9910. S2CID 2640202.
- —— (1989). "A new description of the Bowen–Margulis measure". Ergodic Theory and Dynamical Systems. 9 (3): 455–464. doi:10.1017/S0143385700005095. ISSN 1469-4417.
- —— (1990). "Some regularity theorems for Carnot–Carathéodory metrics". Journal of Differential Geometry. 32 (3): 819–850. Bibcode:1990JDGeo..3245536H. doi:10.4310/jdg/1214445536. ISSN 0022-040X.
