= Lotschnittaxiom =

Geometric axiom

The Lotschnittaxiom (German for "axiom of the intersecting perpendiculars") is an axiom in the foundations of geometry, introduced and studied by Friedrich Bachmann. It states:

Perpendiculars raised on each side of a right angle intersect.

Bachmann showed that, in the absence of the Archimedean axiom, it is strictly weaker than the rectangle axiom, which states that there is a rectangle, which in turn is strictly weaker than the Parallel Postulate, as shown by Max Dehn. In the presence of the Archimedean axiom, the Lotschnittaxiom is equivalent with the Parallel Postulate.

== Equivalent formulations ==
As shown by Bachmann, the Lotschnittaxiom is equivalent to the statement

Through any point inside a right angle there passes a line that intersects both sides of the angle.

It was shown in that it is also equivalent to the statement

The altitude in an isosceles triangle with base angles of 45° is less than the base.

and in that it is equivalent to the following axiom proposed by Lagrange:

If the lines a and b are two intersecting lines that are parallel to a line g, then the reflection of a in b is also parallel to g.

As shown in, the Lotschnittaxiom is also equivalent to the following statements, the first one due to A. Lippman, the second one due to Henri Lebesgue

Given any circle, there exists a triangle containing that circle in its interior.

Given any convex quadrilateral, there exists a triangle containing that convex quadrilateral in its interior.

Three more equivalent formulations, all purely incidence-geometric, were proved in:

Given three parallel lines, there is a line that intersects all three of them.

There exist lines a and b, such that any line intersects a or b.

If the lines a_1, a_2, and a_3 are pairwise parallel, then there is a permutation (i,j,k) of (1,2,3) such that any line g which intersects a_i and a_j also intersects a_k.

== In Bachmann's geometry of line-reflections ==
Its role in Friedrich Bachmann's absolute geometry based on line-reflections, in the absence of order or free mobility (the theory of metric planes) was studied in and in.

== Connection with the Parallel Postulate ==
As shown in, the conjunction of the Lotschnittaxiom and of Aristotle's axiom is equivalent to the Parallel Postulate.

== Sources ==
- Bachmann, Friedrich (1964), "Zur Parallelenfrage", Abhandlungen aus dem Mathematischen Seminar der Universität Hamburg, 27 (3–4): 173–192, doi:10.1007/BF02993215, S2CID 186240918
- Pambuccian, Victor (1994), "Zum Stufenaufbau des Parallelenaxioms", Journal of Geometry, 51 (1–2): 79–88, doi:10.1007/BF01226859, hdl:2027.42/43033, S2CID 28056805
- Pambuccian, Victor; Schacht, Celia (2019), "Lippmann's axiom and Lebesgue's axiom are equivalent to the Lotschnittaxiom", Beiträge zur Algebra und Geometrie, 60 (4): 733–748, doi:10.1007/s13366-019-00445-y, S2CID 149747562
- Pambuccian, Victor; Schacht, Celia (2021), "The ubiquitous axiom", Results in Mathematics, 76 (3): 1–39, doi:10.1007/s00025-021-01424-3, S2CID 236236967
