= Robert König =

Austrian mathematician

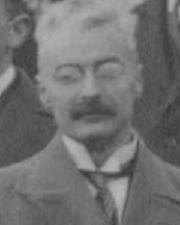
- Robert König, 1930 in Jena
- Born: 11 April 1885; Linz, Austria-Hungary
- Died: 9 July 1979 (aged 94); Munich, West Germany
- Education: Leipzig University; University of Göttingen; University of Vienna
- Scientific career
- Fields: Mathematics
- Workplaces: University of Tübingen; University of Münster; University of Jena; Ludwig-Maximilians-Universität München
- Doctoral advisor: David Hilbert

Robert Johann Maria König (11 April 1885, Linz – 9 July 1979, Munich) was an Austrian mathematician.

He studied from 1903 to 1907 at the University of Vienna and at the University of Göttingen, where he received his PhD under David Hilbert with thesis Oszillationseigenschaften der Eigenfunktionen der Integralgleichung mit definitem Kern und das Jacobische Kriterium der Variationsrechnung. In 1911, he obtained his Habilitation qualification at Leipzig University with thesis Konforme Abbildung der Oberfläche einer räumlichen Ecke.

He worked next at Leipzig University as assistant and privatdocent. In 1914, he was appointed Ausserordentlicher Professor at the University of Tübingen, where in 1921 he became professor ordinarius. In World War I, he was from 1916 to 1918 a member of the Deputy General Staff in Berlin. From 1919 to 1921, he declined three academic calls then accepted in 1922 a call to be Ordentlicher Professor at the University of Münster as successor to Leon Lichtenstein. From 1922 to 1926, he was assistant to Maximilian Krafft, with whom he wrote the textbook Elliptischen Funktionen. In 1927, König was appointed Ordentlicher Professor and institute director at the University of Jena, where he replaced Paul Koebe. From 1934 to 1943, Friedrich Karl Schmidt and König represented pure mathematics at the University of Jena. In 1934, the Saxon Academy of Sciences in Leipzig elected him as a full member.

Because both Schmidt and König were opposed to Nazism, they were involved in disputes over the appointment of new, politically reliable mathematicians at the University of Jena in the Nazi era. After the end of World War II, König went to the Ludwig-Maximilians-Universität München.

At the Ludwig-Maximilians-Universität München from 1947 to 1950, he was instrumental in offering professorships to Constantin Carathéodory and Eberhard Hopf. From 1950 to 1955, König was Ordentlicher Professor at the Ludwig-Maximilians-Universität München. In 1953, he was made a full member in the Bayerischen Akademie der Wissenschaften.

His doctoral students include Helmut Röhrl and Karl-Heinrich Weise, with whom he wrote in 1951 a book on geodesy and cartography Mathematische Grundlagen der höheren Geodäsie und Kartographie.

== Sources ==
- Walter Streitfeld: Universitätsprofessor Dr. Robert König. Zum 80. Geburtstag des Mathematikers am 11. April 1965. In: Oberösterreichischer Kulturbericht. 1965, Folge 13
