= Friedrich Bachmann =

German mathematician (1909–1982)

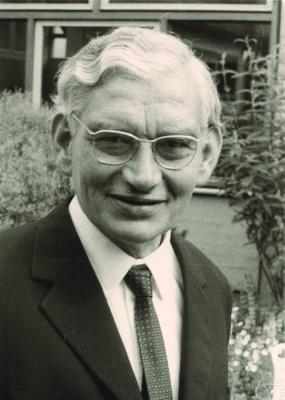
- Friedrich Bachmann, 1969
- Born: 11 February 1909; Wernigerode, German Empire
- Died: 1 October 1982 (aged 73); Kiel, West Germany
- Citizenship: German
- Education: University of Kiel
- Known for: Lotschnittaxiom
- Scientific career
- Fields: Group theory, Geometry
- Thesis: Untersuchungen zur Grundlegung der Arithmetik mit besonderer Beziehung auf Dedekind, Frege, und Russell (1933)
- Doctoral advisor: Heinrich Scholz
- Doctoral students: Andreas Dress

Friedrich Bachmann (11 February 1909 – 1 October 1982) was a German mathematician who specialised in geometry and group theory.

== Life ==
Bachmann was the son of a Lutheran minister Hans Bachmann. Bachmann came from an intellectual family, his paternal grandfather was the number theorist Paul Gustav Heinrich Bachmann. Bachmann took his early education at the Gymnasium in Münster. After attending the Gymnasium, he attended the University of Münster and the Humboldt University of Berlin and graduated in 1927. While there he was a member of the Münster Wingolfs.

In 1933, Bachmann was promoted to D.Phil with a thesis titled, Studies on the foundation of arithmetic with special reference to Dedekind, Frege, and Russell (German: Untersuchungen zur Grundlegung der Arithmetik mit besonderer Beziehung auf Dedekind, Frege, und Russell). His advisor was Heinrich Scholz.

His doctoral students include Andreas Dress and Rolf Lingenberg.

Bachmann was married to a great-granddaughter of Otto von Bismarck, Alexandra von Bredow. They had a son together, Sebastian

== Career ==
In 1935, Bachmann moved to the University of Marburg where assisted Kurt Reidemeister. Bachman habilitated at Marburg before becoming a Privatdozent in 1939.

From 1941 Bachmann became a private lecturer at University of Königsberg and from 1943 at the Humboldt University of Berlin.

On 1 March 1949, he was promoted to full professor (Ordentlicher Professor) at the University of Kiel. He became known for his work on geometry, especially for his axiomatic justification of elementary geometry with mirroring operations, previously begun by Johannes Hjelmslev and others.

After the war, Bachmann worked with the mathematician Karl-Heinrich Weise to rebuild the mathematics department at the University of Kiel. From 1960 Bachman was editor of the series titled, Grundzüge der Mathematik für Lehrer an Gymnasien sowie für Mathematiker in Industrie und Wirtschaft (Basic features of mathematics for teachers at grammar schools as well as for mathematicians in industry and business).

In 1962–1963, Bachmann was elected Dean of the mathematics department of the Faculty of Philosophy of Kiel University.

Bachmann retired on 31 March 1977.

== Bibliography ==
The following are articles, written or co-authored by Bachmann.

- Bachmann, Friedrich; Carnap, Rudolf (1936). "Über Extremalaxiome". Erkenntnis. 6 (1): 166–188. doi:10.1007/BF02538231. S2CID 198144155.
- Langer, Susanne K.; Scholz, Heinrich; Bachmann, Friedrich (March 1937). "Der Wissenschaftliche Nachlass von Gottlob Frege" [The Scientific Estate of Gottlob Frege]. The Journal of Symbolic Logic. 2 (1): 56. doi:10.2307/2268843. JSTOR 2268843.
- Bachmann, Friedrich (December 1937). "Eine Begründung der absoluten Geometrie in der Ebene" [Rationale for absolute geometry in the plane]. Mathematische Annalen. 113 (1): 424–451. doi:10.1007/BF01571645. S2CID 120373278.
- Bachmann, Friedrich (December 1940). "Stufen der absoluten Geometrie. Die Frage nach der Unabhängigkeit der Anordnung" [Levels of absolute geometry. The question of the independence of the order]. Mathematische Annalen. 117–117 (1): 197–234. doi:10.1007/BF01450018. S2CID 119797302.
- Landsberg, M. (1959). "Grundzüge der Mathematik für Lehrer an Gymnasien sowie für Mathematiker in Industrie und Wirtschaft. Band I: Grundlagen der Mathematik, Arithmetik und Algebra. Herausgegeben von H. Behnke, K. Fladt, W. Süß. XII + 558 S. m. 55 Abb. u. 1 Zeittafel. Göttingen 1958. Vandenhoeck & Ruprecht. Preis Ganzl. 50,—DM". Zeitschrift für Angewandte Mathematik und Mechanik. 39 (3–4): 167. doi:10.1002/zamm.19590390319.
- Bachmann, Friedrich (December 1951). "Zur Begründung der Geometrie aus dem Spiegelungsbegriff" [The geometry from the concept of reflection]. Mathematische Annalen. 123 (1): 341–344. doi:10.1007/BF02054959. S2CID 121938290.

The following is books or monographs written by Bachmann

- Bachmann, Friedrich (1973). Aufbau der Geometrie aus dem Spiegelungsbegriff [Building geometry from the mirror concept] (PDF). Berlin, Heidelberg, New York: Friedrich Bachmann Aufbau der Geometrie aus dem Spiegelungsbegriff Mit 160 Abbildungen Zweite erganzte Auflage Springer- Verlag. ISBN 978-3-642-65538-8.
- Bachmann, Friedrich (1989). Ebene Spiegelungsgeometrie : eine Vorlesung über Hjelmslev-Gruppen [Level Mirror geometry: A lecture on Hjelmslev groups]. Mannheim: B.I. Wissenschaftsverlag. ISBN 9783411032198. OCLC 21568149.>
- Bachmann, Friedrich; Schmidt, Eckart (1970). N-Ecke [N-Corner]. B.I.-Hochschultaschenbücher, 471/471a. Mannheim, Wien, Zürich: Bibliographisches Inst.

== Literature ==
- Tobies, Renate (2006). Biographisches Lexikon in Mathematik promovierter Personen : an deutschen Universitäten und Technischen Hochschulen; WS 1907/08 bis WS 1944/45 [Biographical lexicon in mathematics of PhD students at German universities and colleges]. Algorismus, Heft 58. Augsburg: E. Rauner. ISBN 978-3-936905-21-2.
- Benz, Walter (1985). "Friedrich Bachmann 1909-1982 Communications". Mathematischen Gesellschaft in Hamburg. (in German). 11: 291. ISSN 0340-4358.
