= Parabolic geometry (differential geometry) =

Homogeneous quotient space of a semisimple Lie group by a parabolic subgroup

In differential geometry and the study of Lie groups, a parabolic geometry is a homogeneous space G/P which is the quotient of a semisimple Lie group G by a parabolic subgroup P. More generally, the curved analogs of a parabolic geometry in this sense is also called a parabolic geometry: any geometry that is modeled on such a space by means of a Cartan connection.

== Examples ==
The projective space P^{n} is an example. It is the homogeneous space PGL(n+1)/H where H is the isotropy group of a line. In this geometrical space, the notion of a straight line is meaningful, but there is no preferred ("affine") parameter along the lines. The curved analog of projective space is a manifold in which the notion of a geodesic makes sense, but for which there are no preferred parametrizations on those geodesics. A projective connection is the relevant Cartan connection that gives a means for describing a projective geometry by gluing copies of the projective space to the tangent spaces of the base manifold. Broadly speaking, projective geometry refers to the study of manifolds with this kind of connection.

Another example is the conformal sphere. Topologically, it is the n-sphere, but there is no notion of length defined on it, just of angle between curves. Equivalently, this geometry is described as an equivalence class of Riemannian metrics on the sphere (called a conformal class). The group of transformations that preserve angles on the sphere is the Lorentz group O(n+1,1), and so S^{n} = O(n+1,1)/P. Conformal geometry is, more broadly, the study of manifolds with a conformal equivalence class of Riemannian metrics, i.e., manifolds modeled on the conformal sphere. Here the associated Cartan connection is the conformal connection.

Other examples include:

- CR geometry, the study of manifolds modeled on a real hyperquadric $Q^{2(p+q)-1} = SU(p,q)/P \subseteq \mathbb{C}^{p+q}$, where $P$ is the stabilizer of an isotropic line (see CR manifold)
- contact projective geometry, the study of manifolds modeled on $SP(n)/P$ where $P$ is that subgroup of the symplectic group stabilizing the line generated by the first standard basis vector in $\mathbb{R}^{2n}$
