= Cartan connection =

Generalization of affine connections

In the mathematical field of differential geometry, a Cartan connection is a flexible generalization of the notion of an affine connection. It may also be regarded as a specialization of the general concept of a principal connection, in which the geometry of the principal bundle is tied to the geometry of the base manifold using a solder form. Cartan connections describe the geometry of manifolds modelled on homogeneous spaces.

The theory of Cartan connections was developed by Élie Cartan, as part of (and a way of formulating) his method of moving frames (repère mobile). The main idea is to develop a suitable notion of the connection forms and curvature using moving frames adapted to the particular geometrical problem at hand. In relativity or Riemannian geometry, orthonormal frames are used to obtain a description of the Levi-Civita connection as a Cartan connection. For Lie groups, Maurer–Cartan frames are used to view the Maurer–Cartan form of the group as a Cartan connection.

Cartan reformulated the differential geometry of (pseudo) Riemannian geometry, as well as the differential geometry of manifolds equipped with some non-metric structure, including Lie groups and homogeneous spaces. The term 'Cartan connection' most often refers to Cartan's formulation of a (pseudo-)Riemannian, affine, projective, or conformal connection. Although these are the most commonly used Cartan connections, they are special cases of a more general concept.

Cartan's approach seems at first to be coordinate dependent because of the choice of frames it involves. However, it is not, and the notion can be described precisely using the language of principal bundles. Cartan connections induce covariant derivatives and other differential operators on certain associated bundles, hence a notion of parallel transport. They have many applications in geometry and physics: see the method of moving frames, Cartan formalism and Einstein–Cartan theory for some examples.

== Introduction ==
At its roots, geometry consists of a notion of congruence between different objects in a space. In the late 19th century, notions of congruence were typically supplied by the action of a Lie group on space. Lie groups generally act quite rigidly, and so a Cartan geometry is a generalization of this notion of congruence to allow for curvature to be present. The flat Cartan geometries—those with zero curvature—are locally equivalent to homogeneous spaces, hence geometries in the sense of Klein.

A Klein geometry consists of a Lie group G together with a Lie subgroup H of G. Together G and H determine a homogeneous space G/H, on which the group G acts by left-translation. Klein's aim was then to study objects living on the homogeneous space which were congruent by the action of G. A Cartan geometry extends the notion of a Klein geometry by attaching to each point of a manifold a copy of a Klein geometry, and to regard this copy as tangent to the manifold. Thus the geometry of the manifold is infinitesimally identical to that of the Klein geometry, but globally can be quite different. In particular, Cartan geometries no longer have a well-defined action of G on them. However, a Cartan connection supplies a way of connecting the infinitesimal model spaces within the manifold by means of parallel transport.

=== Motivation ===
Consider a smooth surface S in 3-dimensional Euclidean space R^{3}. Near to any point, S can be approximated by its tangent plane at that point, which is an affine subspace of Euclidean space. The affine subspaces are model surfaces—they are the simplest surfaces in R^{3}, and are homogeneous under the Euclidean group of the plane, hence they are Klein geometries in the sense of Felix Klein's Erlangen programme. Every smooth surface S has a unique affine plane tangent to it at each point. The family of all such planes in R^{3}, one attached to each point of S, is called the congruence of tangent planes. A tangent plane can be "rolled" along S, and as it does so the point of contact traces out a curve on S. Conversely, given a curve on S, the tangent plane can be rolled along that curve. This provides a way to identify the tangent planes at different points along the curve by affine (in fact Euclidean) transformations, and is an example of a Cartan connection called an affine connection.

Another example is obtained by replacing the planes, as model surfaces, by spheres, which are homogeneous under the Möbius group of conformal transformations. There is no longer a unique sphere tangent to a smooth surface S at each point, since the radius of the sphere is undetermined. This can be fixed by supposing that the sphere has the same mean curvature as S at the point of contact. Such spheres can again be rolled along curves on S, and this equips S with another type of Cartan connection called a conformal connection.

Differential geometers in the late 19th and early 20th centuries were very interested in using model families such as planes or spheres to describe the geometry of surfaces. A family of model spaces attached to each point of a surface S is called a congruence: in the previous examples there is a canonical choice of such a congruence. A Cartan connection provides an identification between the model spaces in the congruence along any curve in S. An important feature of these identifications is that the point of contact of the model space with S always moves with the curve. This generic condition is characteristic of Cartan connections.

In the modern treatment of affine connections, the point of contact is viewed as the origin in the tangent plane (which is then a vector space), and the movement of the origin is corrected by a translation, and so Cartan connections are not needed. However, there is no canonical way to do this in general: in particular for the conformal connection of a sphere congruence, it is not possible to separate the motion of the point of contact from the rest of the motion in a natural way.

In both of these examples the model space is a homogeneous space G/H.

- In the first case, G/H is the affine plane, with G = Aff(R^{2}) the affine group of the plane, and H = GL(2) the corresponding general linear group.
- In the second case, G/H is the conformal (or celestial) sphere, with G = O^{+}(3,1) the (orthochronous) Lorentz group, and H the stabilizer of a null line in R^{3,1}.

The Cartan geometry of S consists of a copy of the model space G/H at each point of S (with a marked point of contact) together with a notion of "parallel transport" along curves which identifies these copies using elements of G. This notion of parallel transport is generic in the intuitive sense that the point of contact always moves along the curve.

In general, let G be a group with a subgroup H, and M a manifold of the same dimension as G/H. Then, roughly speaking, a Cartan connection on M is a G-connection which is generic with respect to a reduction to H.

=== Affine connections ===
An affine connection on a manifold M is a connection on the frame bundle (principal bundle) of M (or equivalently, a connection on the tangent bundle (vector bundle) of M). A key aspect of the Cartan connection point of view is to elaborate this notion in the context of principal bundles (which could be called the "general or abstract theory of frames").

Let H be a Lie group, $\mathfrak h$ its Lie algebra. Then a principal H-bundle is a fiber bundle P over M with a smooth action of H on P which is free and transitive on the fibers. Thus P is a smooth manifold with a smooth map π: P → M which looks locally like the trivial bundle M × H → M. The frame bundle of M is a principal GL(n)-bundle, while if M is a Riemannian manifold, then the orthonormal frame bundle is a principal O(n)-bundle.

Let R_{h} denote the (right) action of h ∈ H on P. The derivative of this action defines a vertical vector field on P for each element ξ of $\mathfrak h$: if h(t) is a 1-parameter subgroup with h(0)=e (the identity element) and h '(0)=ξ, then the corresponding vertical vector field is

$$X_\xi=\frac{\mathrm d}{\mathrm dt}R_{h(t)}\biggr|_{t=0}.\,$$

A principal H-connection on P is a 1-form $\omega\colon TP\to \mathfrak h$ on P, with values in the Lie algebra $\mathfrak h$ of H, such that

1. $\hbox{Ad}(h)(R_h^*\omega)=\omega$
2. for any $\xi\in \mathfrak h$, ω(X_{ξ}) = ξ (identically on P).

The intuitive idea is that ω(X) provides a vertical component of X, using the isomorphism of the fibers of π with H to identify vertical vectors with elements of $\mathfrak h$.

Frame bundles have additional structure called the solder form, which can be used to extend a principal connection on P to a trivialization of the tangent bundle of P called an absolute parallelism.

In general, suppose that M has dimension n and H acts on R^{n} (this could be any n-dimensional real vector space). A solder form on a principal H-bundle P over M is an R^{n}-valued 1-form θ: TP → R^{n} which is horizontal and equivariant so that it induces a bundle homomorphism from TM to the associated bundle P ×_{H} R^{n}. This is furthermore required to be a bundle isomorphism. Frame bundles have a (canonical or tautological) solder form which sends a tangent vector X ∈ T_{p}P to the coordinates of dπ_{p}(X) ∈ T_{π(p)}M with respect to the frame p.

The pair (ω, θ) (a principal connection and a solder form) defines a 1-form η on P, with values in the Lie algebra $\mathfrak g$ of the semidirect product G of H with R^{n}, which provides an isomorphism of each tangent space T_{p}P with $\mathfrak g$. It induces a principal connection α on the associated principal G-bundle P ×_{H} G. This is a Cartan connection.

Cartan connections generalize affine connections in two ways.

- The action of H on R^{n} need not be effective. This allows, for example, the theory to include spin connections, in which H is the spin group Spin(n) rather than the orthogonal group O(n).
- The group G need not be a semidirect product of H with R^{n}.

=== Klein geometries as model spaces ===
Klein's Erlangen programme suggested that geometry could be regarded as a study of homogeneous spaces: in particular, it is the study of the many geometries of interest to geometers of 19th century (and earlier). A Klein geometry consisted of a space, along with a law for motion within the space (analogous to the Euclidean transformations of classical Euclidean geometry) expressed as a Lie group of transformations. These generalized spaces turn out to be homogeneous smooth manifolds diffeomorphic to the quotient space of a Lie group by a Lie subgroup. The extra differential structure that these homogeneous spaces possess allows one to study and generalize their geometry using calculus.

The general approach of Cartan is to begin with such a smooth Klein geometry, given by a Lie group G and a Lie subgroup H, with associated Lie algebras $\mathfrak g$ and $\mathfrak h$, respectively. Let P be the underlying principal homogeneous space of G. A Klein geometry is the homogeneous space given by the quotient P/H of P by the right action of H. There is a right H-action on the fibres of the canonical projection

π: P → P/H

given by R_{h}g = gh. Moreover, each fibre of π is a copy of H. P has the structure of a principal H-bundle over P/H.

A vector field X on P is vertical if dπ(X) = 0. Any ξ ∈ $\mathfrak h$ gives rise to a canonical vertical vector field X_{ξ} by taking the derivative of the right action of the 1-parameter subgroup of H associated to ξ. The Maurer-Cartan form η of P is the $\mathfrak g$-valued one-form on P which identifies each tangent space with the Lie algebra. It has the following properties:

1. Ad(h) R_{h}^{*}η = η for all h in H
2. η(X_{ξ}) = ξ for all ξ in $\mathfrak h$
3. for all g∈P, η restricts a linear isomorphism of T_{g}P with $\mathfrak g$ (η is an absolute parallelism on P).

In addition to these properties, η satisfies the structure (or structural) equation

$$d\eta+\tfrac{1}{2}[\eta,\eta]=0.$$

Conversely, one can show that given a manifold M and a principal H-bundle P over M, and a 1-form η with these properties, then P is locally isomorphic as an H-bundle to the principal homogeneous bundle G→G/H. The structure equation is the integrability condition for the existence of such a local isomorphism.

A Cartan geometry is a generalization of a smooth Klein geometry, in which the structure equation is not assumed, but is instead used to define a notion of curvature. Thus the Klein geometries are said to be the flat models for Cartan geometries.

== Pseudogroups ==
Cartan connections are closely related to pseudogroup structures on a manifold. Each is thought of as modelled on a Klein geometry G/H, in a manner similar to the way in which Riemannian geometry is modelled on Euclidean space. On a manifold M, one imagines attaching to each point of M a copy of the model space G/H. The symmetry of the model space is then built into the Cartan geometry or pseudogroup structure by positing that the model spaces of nearby points are related by a transformation in G. The fundamental difference between a Cartan geometry and pseudogroup geometry is that the symmetry for a Cartan geometry relates infinitesimally close points by an infinitesimal transformation in G (i.e., an element of the Lie algebra of G) and the analogous notion of symmetry for a pseudogroup structure applies for points that are physically separated within the manifold.

The process of attaching spaces to points, and the attendant symmetries, can be concretely realized by using special coordinate systems. To each point p ∈ M, a neighborhood U_{p} of p is given along with a mapping φ_{p} : U_{p} → G/H. In this way, the model space is attached to each point of M by realizing M locally at each point as an open subset of G/H. We think of this as a family of coordinate systems on M, parametrized by the points of M. Two such parametrized coordinate systems φ and φ′ are H-related if there is an element h_{p} ∈ H, parametrized by p, such that

φ′_{p} = h_{p} φ_{p}.

This freedom corresponds roughly to the physicists' notion of a gauge.

Nearby points are related by joining them with a curve. Suppose that p and p′ are two points in M joined by a curve p_{t}. Then p_{t} supplies a notion of transport of the model space along the curve. Let τ_{t} : G/H → G/H be the (locally defined) composite map

τ_{t} = φ_{p_{t}} o φ_{p_{0}}^{−1}.

Intuitively, τ_{t} is the transport map. A pseudogroup structure requires that τ_{t} be a symmetry of the model space for each t: τ_{t} ∈ G. A Cartan connection requires only that the derivative of τ_{t} be a symmetry of the model space: τ′_{0} ∈ g, the Lie algebra of G.

Typical of Cartan, one motivation for introducing the notion of a Cartan connection was to study the properties of pseudogroups from an infinitesimal point of view. A Cartan connection defines a pseudogroup precisely when the derivative of the transport map τ′ can be integrated, thus recovering a true (G-valued) transport map between the coordinate systems. There is thus an integrability condition at work, and Cartan's method for realizing integrability conditions was to introduce a differential form.

In this case, τ′_{0} defines a differential form at the point p as follows. For a curve γ(t) = p_{t} in M starting at p, we can associate the tangent vector X, as well as a transport map τ_{t}^{γ}. Taking the derivative determines a linear map

$$X \mapsto \left.\frac{d}{dt}\tau_t^\gamma\right|_{t=0} = \theta(X) \in \mathfrak{g}.$$

So θ defines a g-valued differential 1-form on M.

This form, however, is dependent on the choice of parametrized coordinate system. If h : U → H is an H-relation between two parametrized coordinate systems φ and φ′, then the corresponding values of θ are also related by

$$\theta^\prime_p = Ad(h^{-1}_p)\theta_p + h^*_p\omega_H,$$

where ω_{H} is the Maurer-Cartan form of H.

== Formal definition ==
A Cartan geometry modelled on a homogeneous space G/H can be viewed as a deformation of this geometry which allows for the presence of curvature. For example:

- a Riemannian manifold can be seen as a deformation of Euclidean space;
- a Lorentzian manifold can be seen as a deformation of Minkowski space;
- a conformal manifold can be seen as a deformation of the conformal sphere;
- a manifold equipped with an affine connection can be seen as a deformation of an affine space.

There are two main approaches to the definition. In both approaches, M is a smooth manifold of dimension n, H is a Lie group of dimension m, with Lie algebra $\mathfrak h$, and G is a Lie group of dimension n+m, with Lie algebra $\mathfrak g$, containing H as a subgroup.

=== Definition via gauge transitions ===
A Cartan connection consists of a coordinate atlas of open sets U in M, along with a $\mathfrak g$-valued 1-form θ_{U} defined on each chart such that

1. θ_{U} : TU → $\mathfrak g$.
2. θ_{U} mod $\mathfrak h$ : T_{u}U → $\mathfrak g/\mathfrak h$ is a linear isomorphism for every u ∈ U.
3. For any pair of charts U and V in the atlas, there is a smooth mapping h : U ∩ V → H such that

$$\theta_V = Ad(h^{-1})\theta_U + h^*\omega_H,\,$$

where ω_{H} is the Maurer-Cartan form of H.

By analogy with the case when the θ_{U} came from coordinate systems, condition 3 means that φ_{U} is related to φ_{V} by h.

The curvature of a Cartan connection consists of a system of 2-forms defined on the charts, given by

$$\Omega_U = d\theta_U + \tfrac{1}{2}[\theta_U,\theta_U].$$

Ω_{U} satisfy the compatibility condition:

If the forms θ_{U} and θ_{V} are related by a function h : U ∩ V → H, as above, then Ω_{V} = Ad(h^{−1}) Ω_{U}

The definition can be made independent of the coordinate systems by forming the quotient space

$$P = (\coprod_U U\times H)/\sim$$

of the disjoint union over all U in the atlas. The equivalence relation ~ is defined on pairs (x,h_{1}) ∈ U_{1} × H and (x, h_{2}) ∈ U_{2} × H, by

(x,h_{1}) ~ (x, h_{2}) if and only if x ∈ U_{1} ∩ U_{2}, θ_{U_{1}} is related to θ_{U_{2}} by h, and h_{2} = h(x)^{−1} h_{1}.

Then P is a principal H-bundle on M, and the compatibility condition on the connection forms θ_{U} implies that they lift to a $\mathfrak g$-valued 1-form η defined on P (see below).

=== Definition via absolute parallelism ===
Let P be a principal H bundle over M. Then a Cartan connection is a $\mathfrak g$-valued 1-form η on P such that

1. for all h in H, Ad(h)R_{h}^{*}η = η
2. for all ξ in $\mathfrak h$, η(X_{ξ}) = ξ
3. for all p in P, the restriction of η defines a linear isomorphism from the tangent space T_{p}P to $\mathfrak g$.

The last condition is sometimes called the Cartan condition: it means that η defines an absolute parallelism on P. The second condition implies that η is already injective on vertical vectors and that the 1-form η mod $\mathfrak h$, with values in $\mathfrak g/\mathfrak h$, is horizontal. The vector space $\mathfrak g/\mathfrak h$ is a representation of H using the adjoint representation of H on $\mathfrak g$, and the first condition implies that η mod $\mathfrak h$ is equivariant. Hence it defines a bundle homomorphism from TM to the associated bundle $P\times_H \mathfrak g/\mathfrak h$. The Cartan condition is equivalent to this bundle homomorphism being an isomorphism, so that η mod $\mathfrak h$ is a solder form.

The curvature of a Cartan connection is the $\mathfrak g$-valued 2-form Ω defined by

$$\Omega=d\eta+\tfrac{1}{2}[\eta\wedge\eta].$$

Note that this definition of a Cartan connection looks very similar to that of a principal connection. There are several important differences, however. First, the 1-form η takes values in $\mathfrak g$, but is only equivariant under the action of H. Indeed, it cannot be equivariant under the full group G because there is no G bundle and no G action. Secondly, the 1-form is an absolute parallelism, which intuitively means that η yields information about the behavior of additional directions in the principal bundle (rather than simply being a projection operator onto the vertical space). Concretely, the existence of a solder form binds (or solders) the Cartan connection to the underlying differential topology of the manifold.

An intuitive interpretation of the Cartan connection in this form is that it determines a fracturing of the tautological principal bundle associated to a Klein geometry. Thus Cartan geometries are deformed analogues of Klein geometries. This deformation is roughly a prescription for attaching a copy of the model space G/H to each point of M and thinking of that model space as being tangent to (and infinitesimally identical with) the manifold at a point of contact. The fibre of the tautological bundle G → G/H of the Klein geometry at the point of contact is then identified with the fibre of the bundle P. Each such fibre (in G) carries a Maurer-Cartan form for G, and the Cartan connection is a way of assembling these Maurer-Cartan forms gathered from the points of contact into a coherent 1-form η defined on the whole bundle. The fact that only elements of H contribute to the Maurer-Cartan equation Ad(h)R_{h}^{*}η = η has the intuitive interpretation that any other elements of G would move the model space away from the point of contact, and so no longer be tangent to the manifold.

From the Cartan connection, defined in these terms, one can recover a Cartan connection as a system of 1-forms on the manifold (as in the gauge definition) by taking a collection of local trivializations of P given as sections s_{U} : U → P and letting θ_{U} = s^{*}η be the pullbacks of the Cartan connection along the sections.

=== As principal connections ===
Another way in which to define a Cartan connection is as a principal connection on a certain principal G-bundle. From this perspective, a Cartan connection consists of

- a principal G-bundle Q over M
- a principal G-connection α on Q (the Cartan connection)
- a principal H-subbundle P of Q (i.e., a reduction of structure group)

such that the pullback η of α to P satisfies the Cartan condition.

The principal connection α on Q can be recovered from the form η by taking Q to be the associated bundle P ×_{H} G. Conversely, the form η can be recovered from α by pulling back along the inclusion P ⊂ Q.

Since α is a principal connection, it induces a connection on any associated bundle to Q. In particular, the bundle Q ×_{G} G/H of homogeneous spaces over M, whose fibers are copies of the model space G/H, has a connection. The reduction of structure group to H is equivalently given by a section s of E = Q ×_{G} G/H. The fiber of $P\times_H \mathfrak g/\mathfrak h$ over x in M may be viewed as the tangent space at s(x) to the fiber of Q ×_{G} G/H over x. Hence the Cartan condition has the intuitive interpretation that the model spaces are tangent to M along the section s. Since this identification of tangent spaces is induced by the connection, the marked points given by s always move under parallel transport.

=== Definition by an Ehresmann connection ===
Yet another way to define a Cartan connection is with an Ehresmann connection on the bundle E = Q ×_{G} G/H of the preceding section. A Cartan connection then consists of

- A fiber bundle π : E → M with fibre G/H and vertical space VE ⊂ TE.
- A section s : M → E.
- A G-connection θ : TE → VE such that

s^{*}θ_{x} : T_{x}M → V_{s(x)}E is a linear isomorphism of vector spaces for all x ∈ M.

This definition makes rigorous the intuitive ideas presented in the introduction. First, the preferred section s can be thought of as identifying a point of contact between the manifold and the tangent space. The last condition, in particular, means that the tangent space of M at x is isomorphic to the tangent space of the model space at the point of contact. So the model spaces are, in this way, tangent to the manifold.

Development of a curve into the model space at x_{0}

This definition also brings prominently into focus the idea of development. If x_{t} is a curve in M, then the Ehresmann connection on E supplies an associated parallel transport map τ_{t} : E_{x_{t}} → E_{x_{0}} from the fibre over the endpoint of the curve to the fibre over the initial point. In particular, since E is equipped with a preferred section s, the points s(x_{t}) transport back to the fibre over x_{0} and trace out a curve in E_{x_{0}}. This curve is then called the development of the curve x_{t}.

To show that this definition is equivalent to the others above, one must introduce a suitable notion of a moving frame for the bundle E. In general, this is possible for any G-connection on a fibre bundle with structure group G. See Ehresmann connection#Associated bundles for more details.

== Special Cartan connections ==
=== Reductive Cartan connections ===
Let P be a principal H-bundle on M, equipped with a Cartan connection η : TP → $\mathfrak g$. If $\mathfrak g$ is a reductive module for H, meaning that $\mathfrak g$ admits an Ad(H)-invariant splitting of vector spaces $\mathfrak g = \mathfrak h \oplus \mathfrak m$, then the $\mathfrak m$-component of η generalizes the solder form for an affine connection. In detail, η splits into $\mathfrak h$ and $\mathfrak m$ components:

η = η_{$\mathfrak h$} + η_{$\mathfrak m$}.

Note that the 1-form η_{$\mathfrak h$} is a principal H-connection on the original Cartan bundle P. Moreover, the 1-form η_{$\mathfrak m$} satisfies:

η_{$\mathfrak m$}(X) = 0 for every vertical vector X ∈ TP. (η_{$\mathfrak m$} is horizontal.)
R_{h}^{*}η_{$\mathfrak m$} = Ad(h^{−1})η_{$\mathfrak m$} for every h ∈ H. (η_{$\mathfrak m$} is equivariant under the right H-action.)

In other words, η is a solder form for the bundle P.

Hence, P equipped with the form η_{$\mathfrak m$} defines a (first order) H-structure on M. The form η_{$\mathfrak h$} defines a connection on the H-structure.

=== Parabolic Cartan connections ===
If $\mathfrak g$ is a semisimple Lie algebra with parabolic subalgebra $\mathfrak p$ (i.e., $\mathfrak p$ contains a maximal solvable subalgebra of $\mathfrak g$) and G and P are associated Lie groups, then a Cartan connection modelled on (G,P,$\mathfrak g$,$\mathfrak p$) is called a parabolic Cartan geometry, or simply a parabolic geometry. A distinguishing feature of parabolic geometries is a Lie algebra structure on its cotangent spaces: this arises because the perpendicular subspace $\mathfrak p$^{⊥} of $\mathfrak p$ in $\mathfrak g$ with respect to the Killing form of $\mathfrak g$ is a subalgebra of $\mathfrak p$, and the Killing form induces a natural duality between $\mathfrak p$^{⊥} and $\mathfrak g/\mathfrak p$. Thus the bundle associated to $\mathfrak p$^{⊥} is isomorphic to the cotangent bundle.

Parabolic geometries include many of those of interest in research and applications of Cartan connections, such as the following examples:

- Conformal connections: Here G = SO(p+1,q+1), and P is the stabilizer of a null ray in R^{n+2}.
- Projective connections: Here G = PGL(n+1) and P is the stabilizer of a point in RP^{n}.
- CR structures and Cartan-Chern-Tanaka connections: G = PSU(p+1,q+1), P = stabilizer of a point on the projective null hyperquadric.
- Contact projective connections: Here G = SP(2n+2) and P is the stabilizer of the ray generated by the first standard basis vector in R^{n+2}.
- Generic rank 2 distributions on 5-manifolds: Here G = Aut(O_{s}) is the automorphism group of the algebra O_{s} of split octonions, a closed subgroup of SO(3,4), and P is the intersection of G with the stabilizer of the isotropic line spanned by the first standard basis vector in R^{7} viewed as the purely imaginary split octonions (orthogonal complement of the unit element in O_{s}).

== Associated differential operators ==
=== Covariant differentiation ===
Suppose that M is a Cartan geometry modelled on G/H, and let (Q,α) be the principal G-bundle with connection, and (P,η) the corresponding reduction to H with η equal to the pullback of α. Let V a representation of G, and form the vector bundle V = Q ×_{G} V over M. Then the principal G-connection α on Q induces a covariant derivative on V, which is a first order linear differential operator

$$\nabla\colon \Omega^0_M(\mathbf V)\to \Omega^1_M(\mathbf V),$$

where $\Omega^k_M(\mathbf V)$ denotes the space of k-forms on M with values in V so that $\Omega^0_M(\mathbf V)$ is the space of sections of V and $\Omega^1_M(\mathbf V)$ is the space of sections of Hom(TM,V). For any section v of V, the contraction of the covariant derivative ∇v with a vector field X on M is denoted ∇_{X}v and satisfies the following Leibniz rule:

$$\nabla_X(fv)=df(X)v+f \nabla_X v$$

for any smooth function f on M.

The covariant derivative can also be constructed from the Cartan connection η on P. In fact, constructing it in this way is slightly more general in that V need not be a fully fledged representation of G. Suppose instead that V is a ($\mathfrak g$, H)-module: a representation of the group H with a compatible representation of the Lie algebra $\mathfrak{g}$. Recall that a section v of the induced vector bundle V over M can be thought of as an H-equivariant map P → V. This is the point of view we shall adopt. Let X be a vector field on M. Choose any right-invariant lift $\bar{X}$ to the tangent bundle of P. Define

$$\nabla_X v=dv(\bar{X})+\eta(\bar{X})\cdot v$$.

In order to show that ∇v is well defined, it must:

1. be independent of the chosen lift $\bar{X}$
2. be equivariant, so that it descends to a section of the bundle V.

For (1), the ambiguity in selecting a right-invariant lift of X is a transformation of the form $X\mapsto X+X_\xi$ where $X_\xi$ is the right-invariant vertical vector field induced from $\xi\in\mathfrak h$. So, calculating the covariant derivative in terms of the new lift $\bar{X}+X_\xi$, one has

$$\nabla_X v=dv(\bar{X}+X_\xi)+\eta(\bar{X}+X_\xi))\cdot v$$
$$=dv(\bar{X}) +d v(X_\xi)+ \eta(\bar{X})\cdot v+ \xi\cdot v$$
$$=dv(\bar{X})+ \eta(\bar{X})\cdot v$$

since $\xi\cdot v+dv(X_\xi)=0$ by taking the differential of the equivariance property $h\cdot R_{h}^*v=v$ at h equal to the identity element.

For (2), observe that since v is equivariant and $\bar{X}$ is right-invariant, $dv(\bar{X})$ is equivariant. On the other hand, since η is also equivariant, it follows that $\eta(\bar{X})\cdot v$ is equivariant as well.

=== The fundamental or universal derivative ===
Suppose that V is only a representation of the subgroup H and not necessarily the larger group G. Let $\Omega^k(P,V)$ be the space of V-valued differential k-forms on P. In the presence of a Cartan connection, there is a canonical isomorphism

$$\varphi\colon \Omega^k(P,V)\cong \Omega^0(P,V\otimes\bigwedge\nolimits^k\mathfrak g^*)$$

given by $\varphi(\beta)(\xi_1,\xi_2,\dots,\xi_k)=\beta(\eta^{-1}(\xi_1),\dots,\eta^{-1}(\xi_k))$ where $\beta \in \Omega^k(P,V)$ and $\xi_j \in \mathfrak g$.

For each k, the exterior derivative is a first order operator differential operator

$$d\colon \Omega^k(P,V)\rightarrow \Omega^{k+1}(P,V)\,$$

and so, for k=0, it defines a differential operator

$$\varphi\circ d\colon \Omega^0(P,V)\rightarrow \Omega^0(P,V\otimes \mathfrak g^*).\,$$

Because η is equivariant, if v is equivariant, so is Dv := φ(dv). It follows that this composite descends to a first order differential operator D from sections of V=P×_{H}V to sections of the bundle $P\times_H (\mathbf V\otimes \mathfrak g^*)$. This is called the fundamental or universal derivative, or fundamental D-operator.

== Books ==
- Kobayashi, Shoshichi (1972), Transformation Groups in Differential Geometry (Classics in Mathematics 1995 ed.), Springer-Verlag, Berlin, ISBN 978-3-540-58659-3.

The section 3. Cartan Connections [pages 127–130] treats conformal and projective connections in a unified manner.
