= Conformal connection =

In conformal differential geometry, a conformal connection is a Cartan connection on an n-dimensional manifold M arising as a deformation of the Klein geometry given by the celestial n-sphere, viewed as the homogeneous space

O^{+}(n+1,1)/P

where P is the stabilizer of a fixed null line through the origin in R^{n+2}, in the orthochronous Lorentz group O^{+}(n+1,1) in n+2 dimensions.

== Normal Cartan connection ==
Any manifold equipped with a conformal structure has a canonical conformal connection called the normal Cartan connection.

== Formal definition ==
A conformal connection on an n-manifold M is a Cartan geometry modelled on the conformal sphere, where the latter is viewed as a homogeneous space for O^{+}(n+1,1). In other words, it is an O^{+}(n+1,1)-bundle equipped with

- a O^{+}(n+1,1)-connection (the Cartan connection)
- a reduction of structure group to the stabilizer of a point in the conformal sphere (a null line in R^{n+1,1})

such that the solder form induced by these data is an isomorphism.
