= Projective connection =

Type of transport in differential geometry

In differential geometry, a projective connection is a geometric structure on a differentiable manifold that specifies a distinguished class of curves, called geodesics, up to projective reparametrization. Equivalently, in one common formulation, it is given by an equivalence class of torsion-free affine connections having the same unparametrized geodesics.

Projective connections are modeled on the geometry of projective space. In modern terms, they may be described as Cartan connections modeled on projective space; in the normal torsion-free case, this Cartan-geometric description is equivalent to the classical description by projectively equivalent affine connections.

Unlike a Riemannian or pseudo-Riemannian connection, a projective connection does not determine a notion of length, angle, or distance. Its basic geometric datum is instead a notion of straightness: it determines which curves are to be regarded as geodesics, while forgetting the affine parametrization of those curves.

== Projective space as the model geometry ==
The first step in defining any Cartan connection is to consider the flat case: in which the connection corresponds to the Maurer-Cartan form on a homogeneous space.

In the projective setting, the underlying manifold $M$ of the homogeneous space is the projective space RP^{n} which we shall represent by homogeneous coordinates $[x_0,\dots,x_n]$. The symmetry group of $M$ is G = PSL(n+1,R). Let H be the isotropy group of the point $[1,0,0,\ldots,0]$. Thus, M = G/H presents $M$ as a homogeneous space.

Let ${\mathfrak g}$ be the Lie algebra of G, and ${\mathfrak h}$ that of H. Note that ${\mathfrak g} = {\mathfrak s}{\mathfrak l}(n+1,{\mathbb R})$. As matrices relative to the homogeneous basis, ${\mathfrak g}$ consists of trace-free $(n+1)\times(n+1)$ matrices:

$$\left(
\begin{matrix}
\lambda&v^i\\
w_j&a_j^i
\end{matrix}
\right),\quad
(v^i)\in {\mathbb R}^{1\times n}, (w_j)\in {\mathbb R}^{n\times 1}, (a_j^i)\in {\mathbb R}^{n\times n}, \lambda = -\sum_i a_i^i$$.

And ${\mathfrak h}$ consists of all these matrices with $(w_j)=0$. Relative to the matrix representation above, the Maurer-Cartan form of G is a system of 1-forms $(\xi, \alpha_j, \alpha_j^i, \alpha^i)$ satisfying the structural equations (written using the Einstein summation convention):

$$d\xi + \alpha^i \wedge \alpha_i = 0$$
$$d \alpha_j+\alpha_j \wedge \xi+\alpha_{j}^{k}\wedge \alpha_{k}=0$$
$$d \alpha_{j}^{i}+\alpha^{i} \wedge \alpha_{j}+\alpha_{k}^{i}\wedge \alpha_{j}^{k}=0$$
$d \alpha^{i}+\xi \wedge \alpha^{i}+\alpha^{k}\wedge \alpha_{k}^{i}=0$

== Projective structures on manifolds ==
A projective structure is a linear geometry on a manifold in which two nearby points are connected by a line (i.e., an unparametrized geodesic) in a unique manner. Furthermore, an infinitesimal neighborhood of each point is equipped with a class of projective frames. According to Cartan (1924),

Une variété (ou espace) à connexion projective est une variété numérique qui, au voisinage immédiat de chaque point, présente tous les caractères d'un espace projectif et douée de plus d'une loi permettant de raccorder en un seul espace projectif les deux petits morceaux qui entourent deux points infiniment voisins. ...
Analytiquement, on choisira, d'une manière d'ailleurs arbitraire, dans l'espace projectif attaché à chaque point a de la variété, un repére définissant un système de coordonnées projectives. ... Le raccord entre les espaces projectifs attachés à deux points infiniment voisins a et a' se traduira analytiquement par une transformation homographique. ...

This is analogous to Cartan's notion of an affine connection, in which nearby points are thus connected and have an affine frame of reference which is transported from one to the other (Cartan, 1923):

La variété sera dite à "connexion affine" lorsqu'on aura défini, d'une manière d'ailleurs arbitraire, une loi permettant de repérer l'un par rapport à l'autre les espaces affines attachés à deux points infiniment voisins quelconques m et m' de la variété; cete loi permettra de dire que tel point de l'espace affine attaché au point m' correspond à tel point de l'espace affine attaché au point m, que tel vecteur du premier espace es parallèle ou équipollent à tel vecteur du second espace.

In modern language, a projective structure on an n-manifold M is a Cartan geometry modelled on projective space, where the latter is viewed as a homogeneous space for PSL(n+1,R). In other words it is a PSL(n+1,R)-bundle equipped with

- a PSL(n+1,R)-connection (the Cartan connection)
- a reduction of structure group to the stabilizer of a point in projective space

such that the solder form induced by these data is an isomorphism.
