= Erlangen program =

Research program on the symmetries of geometry

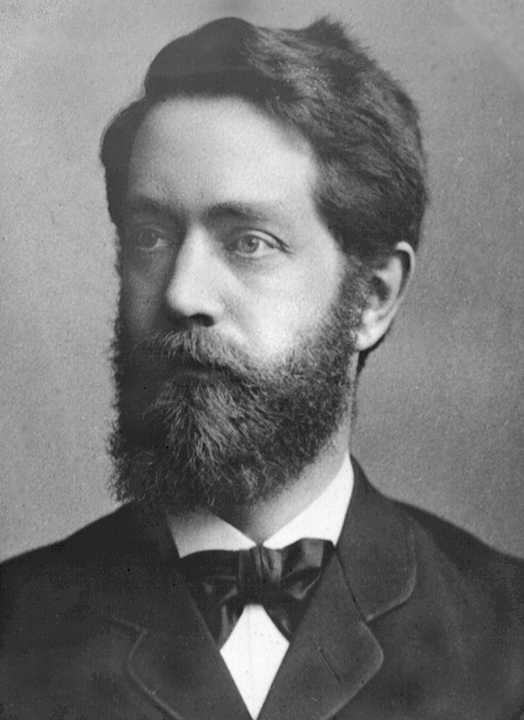
Felix Klein, the father of the Erlangen program

In mathematics, the Erlangen program (German: Erlanger Programm) is a method of characterizing geometries based on group theory and projective geometry. It was published by Felix Klein in 1872 as Vergleichende Betrachtungen über neuere geometrische Forschungen. It is named after the University Erlangen-Nürnberg, where Klein worked.

By 1872, non-Euclidean geometries had emerged, but without a way to determine their hierarchy and relationships. Klein's method was fundamentally innovative in three ways:

- Projective geometry was emphasized as the unifying frame for all other geometries considered by him. In particular, Euclidean geometry was more restrictive than affine geometry, which in turn is more restrictive than projective geometry.

- Klein proposed that group theory, a branch of mathematics that uses algebraic methods to abstract the idea of symmetry, was the most useful way of organizing geometrical knowledge; at the time it had already been introduced into the theory of equations in the form of Galois theory.

- Klein made much more explicit the idea that each geometrical language had its own, appropriate concepts, thus for example projective geometry rightly talked about conic sections, but not about circles or angles because those notions were not invariant under projective transformations (something familiar in geometrical perspective). The way the multiple languages of geometry then came back together could be explained by the way subgroups of a symmetry group related to each other.

Later, Élie Cartan generalized Klein's homogeneous model spaces to Cartan connections on certain principal bundles, which generalized Riemannian geometry.

== The problems of 19th-century geometry ==
Since Euclid, geometry had meant the geometry of Euclidean space of two dimensions (plane geometry) or of three dimensions (solid geometry). In the first half of the nineteenth century there had been several developments complicating the picture. Mathematical applications required geometry of four or more dimensions; the close scrutiny of the foundations of the traditional Euclidean geometry had revealed the independence of the parallel postulate from the others, and non-Euclidean geometry had been born. Klein proposed an idea that all these new geometries are just special cases of the projective geometry, as already developed by Poncelet, Möbius, Cayley and others. Klein also strongly suggested to mathematical physicists that even a moderate cultivation of the projective purview might bring substantial benefits to them.

With every geometry, Klein associated an underlying group of symmetries. The hierarchy of geometries is thus mathematically represented as a hierarchy of these groups, and hierarchy of their invariants. For example, lengths, angles and areas are preserved with respect to the Euclidean group of symmetries, while only the incidence structure and the cross-ratio are preserved under the most general projective transformations. A concept of parallelism, which is preserved in affine geometry, is not meaningful in projective geometry. Then, by abstracting the underlying groups of symmetries from the geometries, the relationships between them can be re-established at the group level. Since the group of affine geometry is a subgroup of the group of projective geometry, any notion invariant in projective geometry is a priori meaningful in affine geometry; but not the other way round. If you remove required symmetries, you have a more powerful theory but fewer concepts and theorems (which will be deeper and more general).

== Homogeneous spaces ==
In other words, the "traditional spaces" are homogeneous spaces; but not for a uniquely determined group. Changing the group changes the appropriate geometric language.

In today's language, the groups concerned in classical geometry are all very well known as Lie groups: the classical groups. The specific relationships are quite simply described, using technical language.

=== Examples ===
For example, the group of projective geometry in n real-valued dimensions is the symmetry group of n-dimensional real projective space (the general linear group of degree n + 1, quotiented by scalar matrices). The affine group will be the subgroup respecting (mapping to itself, not fixing pointwise) the chosen hyperplane at infinity. This subgroup has a known structure (semidirect product of the general linear group of degree n with the subgroup of translations). This description then tells us which properties are 'affine'. In Euclidean plane geometry terms, being a parallelogram is affine since affine transformations always take one parallelogram to another one. Being a circle is not affine since an affine shear will take a circle into an ellipse.

To explain accurately the relationship between affine and Euclidean geometry, we now need to pin down the group of Euclidean geometry within the affine group. The Euclidean group is in fact (using the previous description of the affine group) the semi-direct product of the orthogonal (rotation and reflection) group with the translations. (See Klein geometry for more details.)

== Influence on later work ==
The long-term effects of the Erlangen program can be seen all over pure mathematics (see tacit use at congruence (geometry), for example); and the idea of transformations and of synthesis using groups of symmetry has become standard in physics.

When topology is routinely described in terms of properties invariant under homeomorphism, one can see the underlying idea in operation. The groups involved will be infinite-dimensional in almost all cases – and not Lie groups – but the philosophy is the same. Of course this mostly speaks to the pedagogical influence of Klein. Books such as those by H.S.M. Coxeter routinely used the Erlangen program approach to help 'place' geometries. In pedagogic terms, the program became transformation geometry, a mixed blessing in the sense that it builds on stronger intuitions than the style of Euclid, but is less easily converted into a logical system.

In his book Structuralism (1970) Jean Piaget says, "In the eyes of contemporary structuralist mathematicians, like Bourbaki, the Erlangen program amounts to only a partial victory for structuralism, since they want to subordinate all mathematics, not just geometry, to the idea of structure."

For a geometry and its group, an element of the group is sometimes called a motion of the geometry. For example, one can learn about the Poincaré half-plane model of hyperbolic geometry through a development based on hyperbolic motions. Such a development enables one to methodically prove the ultraparallel theorem by successive motions.

== Abstract returns from the Erlangen program ==
Quite often, it appears there are two or more distinct geometries with isomorphic automorphism groups. There arises the question of reading the Erlangen program from the abstract group, to the geometry.

One example: oriented (i.e., reflections not included) elliptic geometry (i.e., the surface of an n-sphere with opposite points identified) and oriented spherical geometry (the same non-Euclidean geometry, but with opposite points not identified) have isomorphic automorphism group, SO(n+1) for even n. These may appear to be distinct. It turns out, however, that the geometries are very closely related, in a way that can be made precise.

To take another example, elliptic geometries with different radii of curvature have isomorphic automorphism groups. That does not really count as a critique as all such geometries are isomorphic. General Riemannian geometry falls outside the boundaries of the program.

Complex, dual and double (also known as split-complex) numbers appear as homogeneous spaces SL(2,R)/H for the group SL(2,R) and its subgroups H=A, N, K. The group SL(2,R) acts on these homogeneous spaces by linear fractional transformations and a large portion of the respective geometries can be obtained in a uniform way from the Erlangen program.

Some further notable examples have come up in physics.

Firstly, n-dimensional hyperbolic geometry, n-dimensional de Sitter space and (n−1)-dimensional inversive geometry all have isomorphic automorphism groups,

$$\mathrm{O}(n,1)/\mathrm{C}_2,\$$

the orthochronous Lorentz group, for n ≥ 3. But these are apparently distinct geometries. Here some interesting results enter, from the physics. It has been shown that physics models in each of the three geometries are "dual" for some models.

Again, n-dimensional anti-de Sitter space and (n−1)-dimensional conformal space with "Lorentzian" signature (in contrast with conformal space with "Euclidean" signature, which is identical to inversive geometry, for three dimensions or greater) have isomorphic automorphism groups, but are distinct geometries. Once again, there are models in physics with "dualities" between both spaces. See AdS/CFT for more details.

The covering group of SU(2,2) is isomorphic to the covering group of SO(4,2), which is the symmetry group of a 4D conformal Minkowski space and a 5D anti-de Sitter space and a complex four-dimensional twistor space.

The Erlangen program can therefore still be considered fertile, in relation with dualities in physics.

In the seminal paper which introduced categories, Saunders Mac Lane and Samuel Eilenberg stated: "This may be regarded as a continuation of the Klein Erlanger Programm, in the sense that a geometrical space with its group of transformations is generalized to a category with its algebra of mappings."

Relations of the Erlangen program with the work of Charles Ehresmann on groupoids in geometry is considered in the article below by Pradines.

In mathematical logic, the Erlangen program also served as an inspiration for Alfred Tarski in his analysis of logical notions.

== Sources ==
- Klein, Felix (1872) "A comparative review of recent researches in geometry". Complete English Translation is here https://arxiv.org/abs/0807.3161.
- Sharpe, Richard W. (1997) Differential geometry: Cartan's generalization of Klein's Erlangen program Vol. 166. Springer.
- Heinrich Guggenheimer (1977) Differential Geometry, Dover, New York, ISBN 0-486-63433-7.

Covers the work of Lie, Klein and Cartan. On p. 139 Guggenheimer sums up the field by noting, "A Klein geometry is the theory of geometric invariants of a transitive transformation group (Erlangen program, 1872)".

- Thomas Hawkins (1984) "The Erlanger Program of Felix Klein: Reflections on Its Place In the History of Mathematics", Historia Mathematica 11:442–70.
- "Erlangen program", Encyclopedia of Mathematics, EMS Press, 2001 [1994]
- Lizhen Ji and Athanase Papadopoulos (editors) (2015) Sophus Lie and Felix Klein: The Erlangen program and its impact in mathematics and physics, IRMA Lectures in Mathematics and Theoretical Physics 23, European Mathematical Society Publishing House, Zürich.
- Felix Klein (1872) "Vergleichende Betrachtungen über neuere geometrische Forschungen" ('A comparative review of recent researches in geometry'), Mathematische Annalen, 43 (1893) pp. 63–100 (Also: Gesammelte Abh. Vol. 1, Springer, 1921, pp. 460–497).

An English translation by Mellen Haskell appeared in Bull. N. Y. Math. Soc 2 (1892–1893): 215–249.
The original German text of the Erlangen program can be viewed at the University of Michigan online collection at , and also at in HTML format.
A central information page on the Erlangen program maintained by John Baez is at .

- Felix Klein (2004) Elementary Mathematics from an Advanced Standpoint: Geometry, Dover, New York, ISBN 0-486-43481-8

(translation of Elementarmathematik vom höheren Standpunkte aus, Teil II: Geometrie, pub. 1924 by Springer). Has a section on the Erlangen program.
