= Maurer–Cartan form =

Mathematical concept

In mathematics, the Maurer–Cartan form for a Lie group G is a distinguished differential one-form on G that carries the basic infinitesimal information about the structure of G. It was much used by Élie Cartan as a basic ingredient of his method of moving frames, and bears his name together with that of Ludwig Maurer.

As a one-form, the Maurer–Cartan form is peculiar in that it takes its values in the Lie algebra associated to the Lie group G. The Lie algebra is identified with the tangent space of G at the identity, denoted T_{e}G. The Maurer–Cartan form ω is thus a one-form defined globally on G, that is, a linear mapping of the tangent space T_{g}G at each g ∈ G into T_{e}G. It is given as the pushforward of a vector in T_{g}G along the left-translation in the group:

$$\omega(v) = (L_{g^{-1}})_* v,\quad v\in T_gG.$$

== Motivation and interpretation ==
A Lie group acts on itself by multiplication under the mapping

$$G\times G \ni (g,h) \mapsto gh \in G.$$

A question of importance to Cartan and his contemporaries was how to identify a principal homogeneous space of G. That is, a manifold P identical to the group G, but without a fixed choice of unit element. This motivation came, in part, from Felix Klein's Erlangen programme where one was interested in a notion of symmetry on a space, where the symmetries of the space were transformations forming a Lie group. The geometries of interest were homogeneous spaces G/H, but usually without a fixed choice of origin corresponding to the coset eH.

A principal homogeneous space of G is a manifold P abstractly characterized by having a free and transitive action of G on P. The Maurer–Cartan form gives an appropriate infinitesimal characterization of the principal homogeneous space. It is a one-form defined on P satisfying an integrability condition known as the Maurer–Cartan equation. Using this integrability condition, it is possible to define the exponential map of the Lie algebra and in this way obtain, locally, a group action on P.

== Construction ==
=== Intrinsic construction ===
Let g ≅ T_{e}G be the tangent space of a Lie group G at the identity (its Lie algebra). G acts on itself by left translation

$$L : G \times G \to G$$

such that for a given g ∈ G we have

$$L_g : G \to G \quad \mbox{where} \quad L_g(h) = gh,$$

and this induces a map of the tangent bundle to itself: $(L_g)_*:T_hG\to T_{gh}G.$ A left-invariant vector field is a section X of TG such that

$$(L_g)_{*}X = X \quad \forall g \in G.$$

The Maurer–Cartan form ω is a g-valued one-form on G defined on vectors v ∈ T_{g}G by the formula

$$\omega_g(v)=(L_{g^{-1}})_*v.$$

=== Extrinsic construction ===
If G is embedded in GL(n) by a matrix valued mapping g =(g_{ij}), then one can write ω explicitly as

$$\omega_g = g^{-1} \,dg.$$

In this sense, the Maurer–Cartan form is always the left logarithmic derivative of the identity map of G.

=== Characterization as a connection ===
If we regard the Lie group G as a principal bundle over a manifold consisting of a single point then the Maurer–Cartan form can also be characterized abstractly as the unique principal connection on the principal bundle G. Indeed, it is the unique g = T_{e}G valued 1-form on G satisfying

1. $\omega_e = \mathrm{id} : T_eG\rightarrow {\mathfrak g},\text{ and}$
2. $\forall g \in G \quad \omega_g = \mathrm{Ad}(h)(R_h^*\omega_e),\text{ where }h=g^{-1},$

where R_{h}* is the pullback of forms along the right-translation in the group and Ad(h) is the adjoint action on the Lie algebra.

== Properties ==
If X is a left-invariant vector field on G, then ω(X) is constant on G. Furthermore, if X and Y are both left-invariant, then

$$\omega([X,Y])=[\omega(X),\omega(Y)]$$

where the bracket on the left-hand side is the Lie bracket of vector fields, and the bracket on the right-hand side is the bracket on the Lie algebra g. (This may be used as the definition of the bracket on g.) These facts may be used to establish an isomorphism of Lie algebras

$$\mathfrak{g}=T_eG\cong \{\hbox{left-invariant vector fields on G}\}.$$

By the definition of the exterior derivative, if X and Y are arbitrary vector fields then

$$d\omega(X,Y)=X(\omega(Y))-Y(\omega(X))-\omega([X,Y]).$$

Here ω(Y) is the g-valued function obtained by duality from pairing the one-form ω with the vector field Y, and X(ω(Y)) is the Lie derivative of this function along X. Similarly Y(ω(X)) is the Lie derivative along Y of the g-valued function ω(X).

In particular, if X and Y are left-invariant, then

$$X(\omega(Y))=Y(\omega(X))=0,$$

so

$$d\omega(X,Y)+[\omega(X),\omega(Y)]=0$$

but the left-invariant fields span the tangent space at any point (the push-forward of a basis in T_{e}G under a diffeomorphism is still a basis), so the equation is true for any pair of vector fields X and Y. This is known as the Maurer–Cartan equation. It is often written as

$$d\omega + \frac{1}{2}[\omega,\omega]=0.$$

Here [ω, ω] denotes the bracket of Lie algebra-valued forms.

== Maurer–Cartan frame ==
One can also view the Maurer–Cartan form as being constructed from a Maurer–Cartan frame. Let E_{i} be a basis of sections of TG consisting of left-invariant vector fields, and θ^{j} be the dual basis of sections of T^{*}G such that θ^{j}(E_{i}) = δ_{i}^{j}, the Kronecker delta. Then E_{i} is a Maurer–Cartan frame, and θ^{i} is a Maurer–Cartan coframe.

Since E_{i} is left-invariant, applying the Maurer–Cartan form to it simply returns the value of E_{i} at the identity. Thus ω(E_{i}) = E_{i}(e) ∈ g. Thus, the Maurer–Cartan form can be written

$\omega=\sum_iE_i(e)\otimes\theta^i.$	1

Suppose that the Lie brackets of the vector fields E_{i} are given by

$$[E_i,E_j]=\sum_k{c_{ij}}^kE_k.$$

The quantities c_{ij}^{k} are the structure constants of the Lie algebra (relative to the basis E_{i}). A simple calculation, using the definition of the exterior derivative d, yields

$$d\theta^i(E_j,E_k) = -\theta^i([E_j,E_k]) = -\sum_r {c_{jk}}^r\theta^i(E_r) = -{c_{jk}}^i = -\frac{1}{2}({c_{jk}}^i - {c_{kj}}^i),$$

so that by duality

$d\theta^i=-\frac12 \sum_{jk} {c_{jk}}^i\theta^j\wedge\theta^k.$	2

This equation is also often called the Maurer–Cartan equation. To relate it to the previous definition, which only involved the Maurer–Cartan form ω, take the exterior derivative of (1):

$$d\omega = \sum_i E_i(e)\otimes d\theta^i\,=\,-\frac12 \sum_{ijk}{c_{jk}}^iE_i(e)\otimes\theta^j\wedge\theta^k.$$

The frame components are given by

$$d\omega(E_j,E_k) = -\sum_i {c_{jk}}^iE_i(e) = -[E_j(e),E_k(e)]=-[\omega(E_j),\omega(E_k)],$$

which establishes the equivalence of the two forms of the Maurer–Cartan equation.

== On a homogeneous space ==
Maurer–Cartan forms play an important role in Cartan's method of moving frames. In this context, one may view the Maurer–Cartan form as a 1-form defined on the tautological principal bundle associated with a homogeneous space. If H is a closed subgroup of G, then G/H is a smooth manifold of dimension dim G − dim H. The quotient map G → G/H induces the structure of an H-principal bundle over G/H. The Maurer–Cartan form on the Lie group G yields a flat Cartan connection for this principal bundle. In particular, if H = {e}, then this Cartan connection is an ordinary connection form, and we have

$$d\omega+\omega\wedge\omega=0$$

which is the condition for the vanishing of the curvature.

In the method of moving frames, one sometimes considers a local section of the tautological bundle, say s : G/H → G. (If working on a submanifold of the homogeneous space, then s need only be a local section over the submanifold.) The pullback of the Maurer–Cartan form along s defines a non-degenerate g-valued 1-form θ = s^{*}ω over the base. The Maurer–Cartan equation implies that

$$d\theta + \frac{1}{2}[\theta,\theta]=0.$$

Moreover, if s_{U} and s_{V} are a pair of local sections defined, respectively, over open sets U and V, then they are related by an element of H in each fibre of the bundle:

$$h_{UV}(x) = s_V\circ s_U^{-1}(x),\quad x \in U \cap V.$$

The differential of h gives a compatibility condition relating the two sections on the overlap region:

$$\theta_V = \operatorname{Ad}(h^{-1}_{UV})\theta_U + (h_{UV})^* \omega_H$$

where ω_{H} is the Maurer–Cartan form on the group H.

A system of non-degenerate g-valued 1-forms θ_{U} defined on open sets in a manifold M, satisfying the Maurer–Cartan structural equations and the compatibility conditions endows the manifold M locally with the structure of the homogeneous space G/H. In other words, there is locally a diffeomorphism of M into the homogeneous space, such that θ_{U} is the pullback of the Maurer–Cartan form along some section of the tautological bundle. This is a consequence of the existence of primitives of the Darboux derivative.
