= Conformal geometry =

Study of angle-preserving transformations of a geometric space

In mathematics, conformal geometry is the study of the set of angle-preserving (conformal) transformations on a space.

In a real two dimensional space, conformal geometry is precisely the geometry of Riemann surfaces. In space higher than two dimensions, conformal geometry may refer either to the study of conformal transformations of what are called "flat spaces" (such as Euclidean spaces or spheres), or to the study of conformal manifolds that are Riemannian or pseudo-Riemannian manifolds with a class of metrics that are defined up to scale. Study of the flat structures is sometimes termed Möbius geometry, and is a type of Klein geometry.

== Conformal manifolds ==
A conformal manifold is a Riemannian manifold (or pseudo-Riemannian manifold) equipped with an equivalence class of metric tensors, in which two metrics g and h are equivalent if and only if

$$h = \lambda^2 g ,$$

where λ is a real-valued smooth function defined on the manifold and is called the conformal factor. An equivalence class of such metrics is known as a conformal metric or conformal class. Thus, a conformal metric may be regarded as a metric that is only defined "up to scale". Often conformal metrics are treated by selecting a metric in the conformal class, and applying only "conformally invariant" constructions to the chosen metric.

A conformal metric is conformally flat if there is a metric representing it that is flat, in the usual sense that the Riemann curvature tensor vanishes. It may only be possible to find a metric in the conformal class that is flat in an open neighborhood of each point. When it is necessary to distinguish these cases, the latter is called locally conformally flat, although often in the literature no distinction is maintained. The n-sphere is a locally conformally flat manifold that is not globally conformally flat in this sense, whereas a Euclidean space, a torus, or any conformal manifold that is covered by an open subset of Euclidean space is (globally) conformally flat in this sense. A locally conformally flat manifold is locally conformal to a Möbius geometry, meaning that there exists an angle-preserving local diffeomorphism from the manifold into a Möbius geometry. In two dimensions, every conformal metric is locally conformally flat. In dimension n > 3 a conformal metric is locally conformally flat if and only if its Weyl tensor vanishes; in dimension n = 3, if and only if the Cotton tensor vanishes.

Conformal geometry has a number of features that distinguish it from (pseudo-)Riemannian geometry. The first is that although in (pseudo-)Riemannian geometry one has a well-defined metric at each point, in conformal geometry one only has a class of metrics. Thus the length of a tangent vector cannot be defined, but the angle between two vectors still can. Another feature is that there is no Levi-Civita connection because if g and λ^{2}g are two representatives of the conformal structure, then the Christoffel symbols of g and λ^{2}g would not agree. Those associated with λ^{2}g would involve derivatives of the function λ whereas those associated with g would not.

Despite these differences, conformal geometry is still tractable. The Levi-Civita connection and curvature tensor, although only being defined once a particular representative of the conformal structure has been singled out, do satisfy certain transformation laws involving the λ and its derivatives when a different representative is chosen. In particular, (in dimension higher than 3) the Weyl tensor turns out not to depend on λ, and so it is a conformal invariant. Moreover, even though there is no Levi-Civita connection on a conformal manifold, one can instead work with a conformal connection, which can be handled either as a type of Cartan connection modelled on the associated Möbius geometry, or as a Weyl connection. This allows one to define conformal curvature and other invariants of the conformal structure.

== Möbius geometry ==
Möbius geometry is the study of "Euclidean space with a point added at infinity", or a "pseudo-Euclidean space with a null cone added at infinity". That is, the setting is a compactification of a familiar space; the geometry is concerned with the implications of preserving angles.

At an abstract level, the Euclidean and pseudo-Euclidean spaces can be handled in much the same way, except in the case of dimension two. The compactified two-dimensional Minkowski plane exhibits extensive conformal symmetry. Formally, its group of conformal transformations is infinite-dimensional. By contrast, the group of conformal transformations of the compactified Euclidean plane is only 6-dimensional.

=== Two dimensions ===
==== Minkowski plane ====
The conformal group for the Minkowski quadratic form q(x, y) = 2xy in the plane is the abelian Lie group

$$\operatorname{CSO}(1,1) = \left\{ \left. \begin{pmatrix}
e^a&0\\
0&e^b
\end{pmatrix} \right| a , b \in \mathbb{R} \right\} ,$$

with Lie algebra cso(1, 1) consisting of all real diagonal 2 × 2 matrices.

Consider now the Minkowski plane, $\mathbb{R}^2$ equipped with the metric

$$g = 2 \, dx \, dy ~ .$$

A 1-parameter group of conformal transformations gives rise to a vector field X with the property that the Lie derivative of g along X is proportional to g. Symbolically,

L_{X} g = λg for some λ.

In particular, using the above description of the Lie algebra cso(1, 1), this implies that

1. L_{X} dx = a(x) dx
2. L_{X} dy = b(y) dy

for some real-valued functions a and b depending, respectively, on x and y.

Conversely, given any such pair of real-valued functions, there exists a vector field X satisfying 1. and 2. Hence the Lie algebra of infinitesimal symmetries of the conformal structure, the Witt algebra, is infinite-dimensional.

The conformal compactification of the Minkowski plane is a Cartesian product of two circles S^{1} × S^{1}. On the universal cover, there is no obstruction to integrating the infinitesimal symmetries, and so the group of conformal transformations is the infinite-dimensional Lie group

$$(\mathbb{Z}\rtimes\mathrm{Diff}(S^1))\times(\mathbb{Z}\rtimes\mathrm{Diff}(S^1)) ,$$

where Diff(S^{1}) is the diffeomorphism group of the circle.

The conformal group CSO(1, 1) and its Lie algebra are of current interest in two-dimensional conformal field theory.

==== Euclidean space ====
A coordinate grid prior to a Möbius transformation

The same grid after a Möbius transformation

The group of conformal symmetries of the quadratic form

$$q(z,\bar{z}) = z\bar{z}$$

is the group GL_{1}(C) = C^{×}, the multiplicative group of the complex numbers. Its Lie algebra is gl_{1}(C) = C.

Consider the (Euclidean) complex plane equipped with the metric

$$g = dz \, d\bar{z}.$$

The infinitesimal conformal symmetries satisfy

1. $\mathbf{L}_X \, dz = f(z) \, dz$
2. $\mathbf{L}_X \, d\bar{z} = f(\bar{z}) \, d\bar{z} ,$

where f satisfies the Cauchy–Riemann equation, and so is holomorphic over its domain. (See Witt algebra.)

The conformal isometries of a domain therefore consist of holomorphic self-maps. In particular, on the conformal compactification – the Riemann sphere – the conformal transformations are given by the Möbius transformations

$$z \mapsto \frac{az+b}{cz+d}$$

where ad − bc is nonzero.

=== Higher dimensions ===
In two dimensions, the group of conformal automorphisms of a space can be quite large (as in the case of Lorentzian quadratic form) or variable (as with the case of definite (Euclidean) quadratic form). The comparative lack of rigidity of the two-dimensional case compared to that of higher dimensions derives from the analytical fact that the asymptotic developments of the infinitesimal automorphisms of the structure are relatively unconstrained. With a Lorentzian quadratic form, the freedom is in a pair of real-valued functions. With a definite quadratic form, the freedom is in a single holomorphic function.

In the case of higher dimensions, the asymptotic developments of infinitesimal symmetries are at most quadratic polynomials. In particular, they form a finite-dimensional Lie algebra. The pointwise infinitesimal conformal symmetries of a manifold can be integrated precisely when the manifold is a certain model conformally flat space (up to taking universal covers and discrete group quotients).

The general theory of conformal geometry is similar, although with some differences, in the cases of Euclidean and pseudo-Euclidean signature. In either case, there are a number of ways of introducing the model space of conformally flat geometry. Unless otherwise clear from the context, this article treats the case of Euclidean conformal geometry with the understanding that it also applies, mutatis mutandis, to the pseudo-Euclidean situation.

==== Inversive model ====
The inversive model of conformal geometry consists of the group of local transformations on the Euclidean space E^{n} generated by inversion in spheres. By Liouville's theorem, any angle-preserving local (conformal) transformation is of this form. From this perspective, the transformation properties of flat conformal space are those of inversive geometry.

==== Projective model ====
The projective model identifies the conformal sphere with a certain quadric in a projective space. Let q denote the Lorentzian quadratic form on R^{n+2} defined by

$$q(x_0,x_1,\ldots,x_{n+1}) = -2x_0x_{n+1}+x_1^2+x_2^2+\cdots+x_n^2.$$

In the projective space P(R^{n+2}), let S be the locus of q = 0. Then S is the projective (or Möbius) model of conformal geometry. A conformal transformation on S is a projective linear transformation of P(R^{n+2}) that leaves the quadric invariant.

In a related construction, the quadric S is thought of as the celestial sphere at infinity of the null cone in the pseudo-Euclidean space R^{n+1,1}, which is equipped with the quadratic form q as above. The null cone is defined by

$$N = \left\{ ( x_0 , \ldots , x_{n+1} ) \mid -2 x_0 x_{n+1} + x_1^2 + \cdots + x_n^2 = 0 \right\} .$$

This is the affine cone over the projective quadric S. Let N^{+} be the future part of the null cone (with the origin deleted). Then the tautological projection R^{n+1,1} \ {0} → P(R^{n+2}) restricts to a projection N^{+} → S. This gives N^{+} the structure of a line bundle over S. Conformal transformations on S are induced by the orthochronous Lorentz transformations of R^{n+1,1}, since these are homogeneous linear transformations preserving the future null cone.

==== Euclidean sphere ====
Intuitively, the conformally flat geometry of a sphere is less rigid than the Riemannian geometry of a sphere. Conformal symmetries of a sphere are generated by the inversion in all of its hyperspheres. On the other hand, Riemannian isometries of a sphere are generated by inversions in geodesic hyperspheres (see Cartan–Dieudonné theorem). The Euclidean sphere can be mapped to the conformal sphere in a canonical manner, but not vice versa.

The Euclidean unit sphere is the locus in R^{n+1}

$$z^2+x_1^2+x_2^2+\cdots+x_n^2=1.$$

This can be mapped to the pseudo-Euclidean space R^{n+1,1} by letting

$$x_0 = \frac{z+1}{\sqrt{2}},\, x_1=x_1,\, \ldots,\, x_n=x_n,\, x_{n+1}=\frac{z-1}{\sqrt{2}}.$$

It is readily seen that the image of the sphere under this transformation is null in the pseudo-Euclidean space, and so it lies on the cone N^{+}. Consequently, it determines a cross-section of the line bundle N^{+} → S.

Nevertheless, there was an arbitrary choice. If κ(x) is any positive function of x = (z, x_{0}, ..., x_{n}), then the assignment

$$x_0 = \frac{z+1}{\kappa(x)\sqrt{2}}, \, x_1=x_1,\, \ldots,\, x_n=x_n,\, x_{n+1}=\frac{(z-1)\kappa(x)}{\sqrt{2}}$$

also gives a mapping into N^{+}. The function κ is an arbitrary choice of conformal scale.

==== Representative metrics ====
A representative Riemannian metric on the sphere is a metric that is proportional to the standard sphere metric. This gives a realization of the sphere as a conformal manifold. The standard sphere metric is the restriction of the Euclidean metric on R^{n+1}

$$g=dz^2+dx_1^2+dx_2^2+\cdots+dx_n^2$$

to the sphere

$$z^2+x_1^2+x_2^2+\cdots+x_n^2=1.$$

A conformal representative of g is a metric of the form λ^{2}g, where λ is a positive function on the sphere. The conformal class of g, denoted [g], is the collection of all such representatives:

$$[ g ] = \left\{ \lambda ^2 g \mid \lambda > 0 \right\} .$$

An embedding of the Euclidean sphere into N^{+}, as in the previous section, determines a conformal scale on S. Conversely, any conformal scale on S is given by such an embedding. Thus the line bundle N^{+} → S is identified with the bundle of conformal scales on S: to give a section of this bundle is tantamount to specifying a metric in the conformal class [g].

==== Ambient metric model ====
Another way to realize the representative metrics is through a special coordinate system on R^{n+1,1}. Suppose that the Euclidean n-sphere S carries a stereographic coordinate system. This consists of the following map of R^{n} → S ⊂ R^{n+1}:

$$\mathbf{y} \in \mathbf{R} ^n \mapsto \left( \frac{ 2 \mathbf{y} }{ \left| \mathbf{y} \right| ^2 + 1 }, \frac{ \left| \mathbf{y} \right| ^2 - 1 }{ \left| \mathbf{y} \right| ^2 + 1 } \right) \in S \sub \mathbf{R} ^{n+1} .$$

In terms of these stereographic coordinates, it is possible to give a coordinate system on the null cone N^{+} in pseudo-Euclidean space. Using the embedding given above, the representative metric section of the null cone is

$$x_0 = \sqrt{2} \frac{ \left| \mathbf{y} \right| ^2 }{ 1 + \left| \mathbf{y} \right| ^2 } , x_i = \frac{ y_i }{ \left| \mathbf{y} \right| ^2 + 1 } , x _{n+1} = \sqrt{2} \frac{1}{ \left| \mathbf{y} \right| ^2 + 1 } .$$

Introduce a new variable t corresponding to dilations up N^{+}, so that the null cone is coordinatized by

$$x_0 = t \sqrt{2} \frac{ \left| \mathbf{y} \right| ^2}{ 1 + \left| \mathbf{y} \right| ^2 }, x_i = t \frac{y_i}{ \left| \mathbf{y} \right| ^2 + 1}, x_{n+1} = t \sqrt{2} \frac{1}{ \left| \mathbf{y} \right| ^2 + 1 } .$$

Finally, let ρ be the following defining function of N^{+}:

$$\rho = \frac{ - 2 x _0 x _{n+1} + x _1^2 + x _2^2 + \cdots + x _n^2 }{ t ^2 } .$$

In the t, ρ, y coordinates on R^{n+1,1}, the Lorentzian metric takes the form:

$$t ^2 g _{ij} ( y ) \, dy ^i \, dy ^j + 2 \rho \, dt ^2 + 2 t \, dt \, d \rho ,$$

where g_{ij} is the metric on the sphere.

In these terms, a section of the bundle N^{+} consists of a specification of the value of the variable t = t(y^{i}) as a function of the y^{i} along the null cone ρ = 0. This yields the following representative of the conformal metric on S:

$$t ( y ) ^2 g _{ij} \, d y ^i \, d y ^j .$$

==== Kleinian model ====
Consider first the case of the flat conformal geometry in Euclidean signature. The n-dimensional model is the celestial sphere of the (n + 2)-dimensional Lorentzian space R^{n+1,1}. Here the model is a Klein geometry: a homogeneous space G/H where G = SO(n + 1, 1) acting on the (n + 2)-dimensional Lorentzian space R^{n+1,1} and H is the isotropy group of a fixed null ray in the light cone. Thus the conformally flat models are the spaces of inversive geometry. For pseudo-Euclidean of metric signature (p, q), the model flat geometry is defined analogously as the homogeneous space O(p + 1, q + 1) / H, where H is again taken as the stabilizer of a null line. Note that both the Euclidean and pseudo-Euclidean model spaces are compact.

==== Conformal Lie algebras ====
To describe the groups and algebras involved in the flat model space, fix the following form on R^{p+1,q+1}:

$$Q=\begin{pmatrix}
0&0&-1\\
0&J&0\\
-1&0&0
\end{pmatrix}$$

where J is a quadratic form of signature (p, q). Then G = O(p + 1, q + 1) consists of (n + 2) × (n + 2) matrices stabilizing Q : ^{t}MQM = Q (the superscript t means transpose). The Lie algebra admits a Cartan decomposition

$$\mathbf{g}=\mathbf{g}_{-1}\oplus\mathbf{g}_0\oplus\mathbf{g}_1$$

where

$$\mathbf{g}_{-1} = \left\{\left.
\begin{pmatrix}
0&^\text{t}p&0\\
0&0&J^{-1}p\\
0&0&0
\end{pmatrix}\right| p\in\mathbb{R}^n\right\},\quad
\mathbf{g}_{-1} = \left\{\left.
\begin{pmatrix}
0&0&0\\
^\text{t}q&0&0\\
0&qJ^{-1}&0
\end{pmatrix}\right| q\in(\mathbb{R}^n)^*\right\}$$
$$\mathbf{g}_0 = \left\{\left.
\begin{pmatrix}
-a & 0 & 0\\
0 & A & 0\\
0 & 0 & a
\end{pmatrix} \right| A \in \mathfrak{so} ( p , q ) , a \in \mathbb{R} \right\} .$$

Alternatively, this decomposition agrees with a natural Lie algebra structure defined on R^{n} ⊕ cso(p, q) ⊕ (R^{n})^{∗}.

The stabilizer of the null ray pointing up the last coordinate vector is given by the Borel subalgebra

h = g_{0} ⊕ g_{1}.

== See also ==
- Conformal geometric algebra
- Conformal gravity
- Conformal Killing equation
- Erlangen program
- Möbius plane
