= Klein geometry =

Type of geometry

In mathematics, a Klein geometry is a type of geometry motivated by Felix Klein in his influential Erlangen program. More specifically, it is a homogeneous space X together with a transitive action on X by a Lie group G, which acts as the symmetry group of the geometry.

For background and motivation see the article on the Erlangen program.

== Formal definition ==
A Klein geometry is a pair (G, H) where G is a Lie group and H is a closed Lie subgroup of G such that the (left) coset space G/H is connected. The group G is called the principal group of the geometry and G/H is called the space of the geometry (or, by an abuse of terminology, simply the Klein geometry). The space X = G/H of a Klein geometry is a smooth manifold of dimension

dim X = dim G − dim H.

There is a natural smooth left action of G on X given by

$$g \cdot (aH) = (ga)H.$$

Clearly, this action is transitive (take a = 1), so that one may then regard X as a homogeneous space for the action of G. The stabilizer of the identity coset H ∈ X is precisely the group H.

Given any connected smooth manifold X and a smooth transitive action by a Lie group G on X, we can construct an associated Klein geometry (G, H) by fixing a basepoint x_{0} in X and letting H be the stabilizer subgroup of x_{0} in G. The group H is necessarily a closed subgroup of G and X is naturally diffeomorphic to G/H.

Two Klein geometries (G_{1}, H_{1}) and (G_{2}, H_{2}) are geometrically isomorphic if there is a Lie group isomorphism φ : G_{1} → G_{2} so that φ(H_{1}) = H_{2}. In particular, if φ is conjugation by an element g ∈ G, we see that (G, H) and (G, gHg^{−1}) are isomorphic. The Klein geometry associated to a homogeneous space X is then unique up to isomorphism (i.e. it is independent of the chosen basepoint x_{0}).

== Bundle description ==
Given a Lie group G and closed subgroup H, there is natural right action of H on G given by right multiplication. This action is both free and proper. The orbits are simply the left cosets of H in G. One concludes that G has the structure of a smooth principal H-bundle over the left coset space G/H:

$$H\to G\to G/H .$$

== Types of Klein geometries ==
=== Effective geometries ===
The action of G on X = G/H need not be effective. The kernel of a Klein geometry is defined to be the kernel of the action of G on X. It is given by

$$K = \{k \in G : g^{-1}kg \in H\;\;\forall g \in G\}.$$

The kernel K may also be described as the core of H in G (i.e. the largest subgroup of H that is normal in G). It is the group generated by all the normal subgroups of G that lie in H.

A Klein geometry is said to be effective if K = 1 and locally effective if K is discrete. If (G, H) is a Klein geometry with kernel K, then (G/K, H/K) is an effective Klein geometry canonically associated to (G, H).

=== Geometrically oriented geometries ===
A Klein geometry (G, H) is geometrically oriented if G is connected. (This does not imply that G/H is an oriented manifold). If H is connected it follows that G is also connected (this is because G/H is assumed to be connected, and G → G/H is a fibration).

Given any Klein geometry (G, H), there is a geometrically oriented geometry canonically associated to (G, H) with the same base space G/H. This is the geometry (G_{0}, G_{0} ∩ H) where G_{0} is the identity component of G. Note that G = G_{0} H.

=== Reductive geometries ===
A Klein geometry (G, H) is said to be reductive and G/H a reductive homogeneous space if the Lie algebra $\mathfrak h$ of H has an H-invariant complement in $\mathfrak g$.

== Examples ==
In the following table, there is a description of the classical geometries, modeled as Klein geometries.

	Underlying space	Transformation group G	Subgroup H	Invariants
Projective geometry	Real projective space $\mathbb{R}\mathrm{P}^n$	Projective group $\mathrm{PGL}(n+1)$	A subgroup $P$ fixing a flag $\{0\}\subset V_1\subset V_n$	Projective lines, cross-ratio
Conformal geometry on the sphere	Sphere $S^n$	Lorentz group of an $(n+2)$-dimensional space $\mathrm{O}(n+1,1)$	A subgroup $P$ fixing a line in the null cone of the Minkowski metric	Generalized circles, angles
Hyperbolic geometry	Hyperbolic space $H(n)$, modelled e.g. as time-like lines through the origin in the Minkowski space $\R^{1,n}$	Orthochronous Lorentz group $\mathrm{O}(1,n)/\mathrm{O}(1)$	$\mathrm{O}(1)\times \mathrm{O}(n)$	Lines, circles, distances, angles
Elliptic geometry	Elliptic space, modelled e.g. as the lines through the origin in Euclidean space $\mathbb{R}^{n+1}$	$\mathrm{O}(n+1)/\mathrm{O}(1)$	$\mathrm{O}(n)/\mathrm{O}(1)$	Lines, circles, distances, angles
Spherical geometry	Sphere $S^n$	Orthogonal group $\mathrm{O}(n+1)$	Orthogonal group $\mathrm{O}(n)$	Lines (great circles), circles, distances of points, angles
Affine geometry	Affine space $A(n)\simeq\R^n$	Affine group $\mathrm{Aff}(n)\simeq \R^n \rtimes \mathrm{GL}(n)$	General linear group $\mathrm{GL}(n)$	Lines, quotient of surface areas of geometric shapes, center of mass of triangles
Euclidean geometry	Euclidean space $E(n)$	Euclidean group $\mathrm{Euc}(n)\simeq \R^n \rtimes \mathrm{O}(n)$	Orthogonal group $\mathrm{O}(n)$	Distances of points, angles of vectors, areas
