= Homogeneous space =

Topological space in group theory

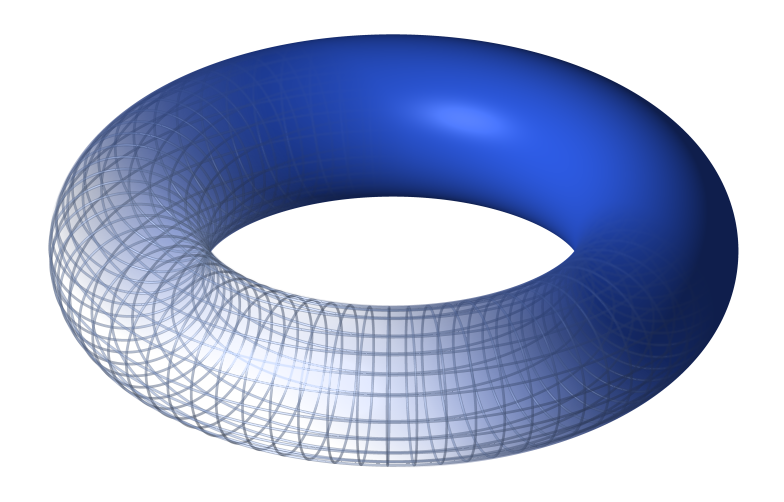
A torus. The standard torus is homogeneous under its diffeomorphism and homeomorphism groups, and the flat torus is homogeneous under its diffeomorphism, homeomorphism, and isometry groups.

In mathematics, a homogeneous space is, very informally, a space that looks the same everywhere as one moves through it, with movement given by the action of a group. Homogeneous spaces occur in the theories of Lie groups, algebraic groups and topological groups. More precisely, a homogeneous space for a group G is a non-empty manifold or topological space X on which G acts transitively. The elements of G are called the symmetries of X.

A special case of this is when the group G in question is the automorphism group of the space X – here "automorphism group" can mean isometry group, diffeomorphism group, or homeomorphism group. In this case, X is homogeneous if intuitively X looks locally the same at each point, either in the sense of isometry (rigid geometry), diffeomorphism (differential geometry), or homeomorphism (topology).

Some authors insist that the action of G be faithful (non-identity elements act non-trivially), although the present article does not. Thus there is a group action of G on X that can be thought of as preserving some "geometric structure" on X, and making X into a single G-orbit.

== Formal definition ==
Let X be a non-empty set and G a group. Then X is called a G-space if it is equipped with an action of G on X. Note that automatically G acts by automorphisms (bijections) on the set. If X in addition belongs to some category, then the elements of G are assumed to act as automorphisms in the same category. That is, the maps on X coming from elements of G preserve the structure associated with the category (for example, if X is an object in Diff then the action is required to be by diffeomorphisms). A homogeneous space is a G-space on which G acts transitively.

If X is an object of the category C, then the structure of a G-space is a homomorphism:

$$\rho : G \to \mathrm{Aut}_{\mathbf{C}}(X)$$

into the group of automorphisms of the object X in the category C. The pair (X, ρ) defines a homogeneous space provided ρ(G) is a transitive group of symmetries of the underlying set of X.

=== Examples ===
For example, if X is a topological space, then group elements are assumed to act as homeomorphisms on X. The structure of a G-space is a group homomorphism ρ : G → Homeo(X) into the homeomorphism group of X.

Similarly, if X is a differentiable manifold, then the group elements are diffeomorphisms. The structure of a G-space is a group homomorphism ρ : G → Diffeo(X) into the diffeomorphism group of X.

Riemannian symmetric spaces are an important class of homogeneous spaces, and include many of the examples listed below.

Concrete examples include:

Examples of homogeneous spaces
space X	group G	stabilizer H
spherical space S^{n−1}	O(n)	O(n − 1)
oriented S^{n−1}	SO(n)	SO(n − 1)
projective space PR^{n−1}	PO(n)	PO(n − 1)
Euclidean space E^{n}	E(n)	O(n)
oriented E^{n}	E^{+}(n)	SO(n)
hyperbolic space H^{n}	O^{+}(1, n)	O(n)
oriented H^{n}	SO^{+}(1, n)	SO(n)
anti-de Sitter space AdS_{n+1}	O(2, n)	O(1, n)
Grassmannian Gr(r, n)	O(n)	O(r) × O(n − r)
affine space A(n, K)	Aff(n, K)	GL(n, K)

Isometry groups

- Positive curvature:
  1. Sphere (orthogonal group): S^{n−1} ≅ O(n) / O(n−1). This is true because of the following observations: First, S^{n−1} is the set of vectors in R^{n} with norm 1. If we consider one of these vectors as a base vector, then any other vector can be constructed using an orthogonal transformation. If we consider the span of this vector as a one dimensional subspace of R^{n}, then the complement is an (n − 1)-dimensional vector space that is invariant under an orthogonal transformation from O(n − 1). This shows us why we can construct S^{n−1} as a homogeneous space.
  2. Oriented sphere (special orthogonal group): S^{n−1} ≅ SO(n) / SO(n − 1)
  3. Projective space (projective orthogonal group): P^{n−1} ≅ PO(n) / PO(n − 1)
- Flat (zero curvature):
  1. Euclidean space (Euclidean group, point stabilizer is orthogonal group): E^{n} ≅ E(n) / O(n)
- Negative curvature:
  1. Hyperbolic space (orthochronous Lorentz group, point stabilizer orthogonal group, corresponding to hyperboloid model): H^{n} ≅ O^{+}(1, n) / O(n)
  2. Oriented hyperbolic space: SO^{+}(1, n) / SO(n)
  3. Anti-de Sitter space: AdS_{n+1} = O(2, n) / O(1, n)

Others

- Affine space over field K (for affine group, point stabilizer general linear group): A^{n} = Aff(n, K) / GL(n, K).
- Grassmannian: Gr(r, n) = O(n) / (O(r) × O(n − r))
- Topological vector spaces (in the sense of topology)
- There are other interesting homogeneous spaces, in particular with relevance in physics: This includes Minkowski space M^{n} ≅ ISO(n-1,1) / SO(n,1) or Galilean and Carrollian spaces.

== Geometry ==
From the point of view of the Erlangen program, one may understand that "all points are the same", in the geometry of X. This was true of essentially all geometries proposed before Riemannian geometry, in the middle of the nineteenth century.

Thus, for example, Euclidean space, affine space and projective space are all in natural ways homogeneous spaces for their respective symmetry groups. The same is true of the models found of non-Euclidean geometry of constant curvature, such as hyperbolic space.

A further classical example is the space of lines in projective space of three dimensions (equivalently, the space of two-dimensional subspaces of a four-dimensional vector space). It is simple linear algebra to show that GL_{4} acts transitively on those. We can parameterize them by line co-ordinates: these are the 2×2 minors of the 4×2 matrix with columns two basis vectors for the subspace. The geometry of the resulting homogeneous space is the line geometry of Julius Plücker.

== Homogeneous spaces as coset spaces ==
In general, if X is a homogeneous space of G, and H_{o} is the stabilizer of some marked point o in X (a choice of origin), the points of X correspond to the left cosets G/H_{o}, and the marked point o corresponds to the coset of the identity. Conversely, given a coset space G/H, it is a homogeneous space for G with a distinguished point, namely the coset of the identity. Thus a homogeneous space can be thought of as a coset space without a choice of origin.

For example, if H is the identity subgroup {e}, then X is the G-torsor, which explains why G-torsors are often described intuitively as "G with forgotten identity".

In general, a different choice of origin o will lead to a quotient of G by a different subgroup H_{o′} that is related to H_{o} by an inner automorphism of G. Specifically,

$$H_{o'} = gH_og^{-1}$$	1

where g is any element of G for which go = o′. Note that the inner automorphism (1) does not depend on which such g is selected; it depends only on g modulo H_{o}.

If the action of G on X is continuous and X is Hausdorff, then H is a closed subgroup of G. In particular, if G is a Lie group, then H is a Lie subgroup by Cartan's theorem. Hence G / H is a smooth manifold and so X carries a unique smooth structure compatible with the group action.

One can go further to double coset spaces, notably Clifford–Klein forms Γ\G/H, where Γ is a discrete subgroup (of G) acting properly discontinuously.

== Example ==
For example, in the line geometry case, we can identify H as a 12-dimensional subgroup of the 16-dimensional general linear group, GL(4), defined by conditions on the matrix entries

h_{13} = h_{14} = h_{23} = h_{24} = 0,

by looking for the stabilizer of the subspace spanned by the first two standard basis vectors. That shows that X has dimension 4.

Since the homogeneous coordinates given by the minors are 6 in number, this means that the latter are not independent of each other. In fact, a single quadratic relation holds between the six minors, as was known to nineteenth-century geometers.

This example was the first known example of a Grassmannian, other than a projective space. There are many further homogeneous spaces of the classical linear groups in common use in mathematics.

== Prehomogeneous vector spaces ==
The idea of a prehomogeneous vector space was introduced by Mikio Sato.

It is a finite-dimensional vector space V with a group action of an algebraic group G, such that there is an orbit of G that is open for the Zariski topology (and so, dense). An example is GL(1) acting on a one-dimensional space.

The definition is more restrictive than it initially appears: such spaces have remarkable properties, and there is a classification of irreducible prehomogeneous vector spaces, up to a transformation known as "castling".

== Homogeneous spaces in physics ==
Given the Poincaré group G and its subgroup the Lorentz group H, the space of cosets G / H is the Minkowski space. Together with de Sitter space and anti-de Sitter space these are the maximally symmetric lorentzian spacetimes. There are also homogeneous spaces of relevance in physics that are non-lorentzian, for example Galilean, Carrollian or Aristotelian spacetimes.

Physical cosmology using the general theory of relativity makes use of the Bianchi classification system. Homogeneous spaces in relativity represent the space part of background metrics for some cosmological models; for example, the three cases of the Friedmann–Lemaître–Robertson–Walker metric may be represented by subsets of the Bianchi I (flat), V (open), VII (flat or open) and IX (closed) types, while the Mixmaster universe represents an anisotropic example of a Bianchi IX cosmology.

A homogeneous space of N dimensions admits a set of at least N and up to 1/2N(N + 1) Killing vectors. For three dimensions, this gives a total of up to six linearly independent Killing vector fields; homogeneous 3-spaces have the property that one may use linear combinations of these to find three everywhere non-vanishing Killing vector fields ξ^{(a)}_{i},

$$\xi^{(a)}_{[i;k]}=C^a_{\ bc}\xi^{(b)}_i \xi^{(c)}_k ,$$

where the object C^{a}_{bc}, the "structure constants", form a constant order-three tensor antisymmetric in its lower two indices (on the left-hand side, the brackets denote antisymmetrisation and ";" represents the covariant differential operator). In the case of a flat isotropic universe, one possibility is C^{a}_{bc} = 0 (type I), but in the case of a closed FLRW universe, C^{a}_{bc} = ε^{a}_{bc}, where ε^{a}_{bc} is the Levi-Civita symbol.

== See also ==
- Erlangen program
- Klein geometry
- Heap (mathematics)
- Homogeneous variety
