= Spherical wave transformation =

Mathematical transformation

Spherical wave transformations leave the form of spherical waves as well as the laws of optics and electrodynamics invariant in all inertial frames. They were defined between 1908 and 1909 by Harry Bateman and Ebenezer Cunningham, with Bateman giving the transformation its name. (Note: Bateman (1908); Bateman (1909); Cunningham (1909)) They correspond to the conformal group of "transformations by reciprocal radii" in relation to the framework of Lie sphere geometry, which were already known in the 19th century.

Time is used as fourth dimension as in Minkowski space, so spherical wave transformations are connected to the Lorentz transformation of special relativity, and it turns out that the conformal group of spacetime includes the Lorentz group and the Poincaré group as subgroups. However, only the Lorentz/Poincaré groups represent symmetries of all laws of nature including mechanics, whereas the conformal group is related to certain areas such as electrodynamics. In addition, it can be shown that the conformal group of the plane (corresponding to the Möbius group of the extended complex plane) is isomorphic to the Lorentz group.

A special case of Lie sphere geometry is the transformation by reciprocal directions or Laguerre inversion, being a generator of the Laguerre group. It transforms not only spheres into spheres but also planes into planes. If time is used as fourth dimension, a close analogy to the Lorentz transformation as well as isomorphism to the Lorentz group was pointed out by several authors such as Bateman, Cartan or Poincaré. (Note: Bateman (1910b), p. 624) (Note: Poincaré (1912), p. 145)

== Transformation by reciprocal radii ==
=== Development in the 19th century ===
Inversions preserving angles between circles were first discussed by Durrande (1820), with Quetelet (1827) and Plücker (1828) writing down the corresponding transformation formula, $k$ being the radius of inversion:

$$x^{\prime}=\frac{k^{2}x}{x^{2}+y^{2}},\quad y^{\prime}=\frac{k^{2}y}{x^{2}+y^{2}}$$.

These inversions were later called "transformations by reciprocal radii", and became better known when Thomson (1845, 1847) applied them on spheres with coordinates $x, y, z$ in the course of developing the method of inversion in electrostatics. Joseph Liouville (1847) demonstrated its mathematical meaning by showing that it belongs to the conformal transformations producing the following quadratic form: (Note: Liouville (1847); Liouville (1850a); Liouville (1850b))

$$\delta x^{\prime2}+\delta y^{\prime2}+\delta z^{\prime2}=\lambda\left(\delta x^{2}+\delta y^{2}+\delta z^{2}\right)$$.

Liouville himself (Note: Liouville (1850b)) and more extensively Sophus Lie (1871) (Note: Lie (1871); Lie (1872)) showed that the related conformal group can be differentiated (Liouville's theorem): For instance, $\lambda=1$ includes the Euclidean group of ordinary motions; $\lambda\ne 1$ scale or similarity transformations in which the coordinates of the previous transformations are multiplied by $\sqrt{\lambda}$; and $\lambda=k^{4}/\left(x^{2}+y^{2}+z^{2}\right)^{2}$ gives Thomson's transformation by reciprocal radii (inversions):

$$x^{\prime}=\frac{k^{2}x}{x^{2}+y^{2}+z^{2}},\quad y^{\prime}=\frac{k^{2}y}{x^{2}+y^{2}+z^{2}},\quad z^{\prime}=\frac{k^{2}z}{x^{2}+y^{2}+z^{2}}$$.

Subsequently, Liouville's theorem was extended to $n$ dimensions by Lie (1871) and others such as Darboux (1878): (Note: Darboux (1872), p. 282)

$$\delta x_{1}^{\prime2}+\dots+\delta x_{n}^{\prime2}=\lambda\left(\delta x_{1}^{2}+\dots+\delta x_{n}^{2}\right)$$.

This group of conformal transformations by reciprocal radii preserves angles and transforms spheres into spheres or hyperspheres (see Möbius transformation, conformal symmetry, special conformal transformation). It is a 6-parameter group in the plane R^{2} which corresponds to the Möbius group of the extended complex plane, a 10-parameter group in space R^{3}, and a 15-parameter group in R^{4}. In R^{2} it represents only a small subset of all conformal transformations therein, whereas in R^{2+n} it is identical to the group of all conformal transformations (corresponding to the Möbius transformations in higher dimensions) therein, in accordance with Liouville's theorem. Conformal transformations in R^{3} were often applied to what Darboux (1873) called "pentaspherical coordinates" by relating the points to homogeneous coordinates based on five spheres.

=== Oriented spheres ===
Another method for solving such sphere problems was to write down the coordinates together with the sphere's radius. This was employed by Lie (1871) in the context of Lie sphere geometry which represents a general framework of sphere-transformations (being a special case of contact transformations) conserving lines of curvature and transforming spheres into spheres. (Note: Lie (1872), p. 183) The previously mentioned 10-parameter group in R^{3} related to pentaspherical coordinates is extended to the 15-parameter group of Lie sphere transformations related to "hexaspherical coordinates" (named by Klein in 1893) by adding a sixth homogeneous coordinate related to the radius. (Note: Klein (1893), p. 474) Since the radius of a sphere can have a positive or negative sign, one sphere always corresponds to two transformed spheres. It is advantageous to remove this ambiguity by attributing a definite sign to the radius, consequently giving the spheres a definite orientation too, so that one oriented sphere corresponds to one transformed oriented sphere. This method was occasionally and implicitly employed by Lie (1871) himself and explicitly introduced by Laguerre (1880). (Note: Laguerre (1881); Laguerre (1905), pp. 592–684 (collection or papers published between 1880 and 1885).) In addition, Darboux (1887) brought the transformations by reciprocal radii into a form by which the radius r of a sphere can be determined if the radius of the other one is known: (Note: Darboux (1887), p. 225)

$$\begin{align}
x^{\prime} & =\frac{k^{2}x}{x^{2}+y^{2}+z^{2}-r^{2}},\quad & z^{\prime} & =\frac{k^{2}z}{x^{2}+y^{2}+z^{2}-r^{2}},\\
y' & =\frac{k^{2}y}{x^{2}+y^{2}+z^{2}-r^{2}}, & r^{\prime} & =\frac{\pm k^{2}r}{x^{2}+y^{2}+z^{2}-r^{2}}.
\end{align}$$

Using coordinates together with the radius was often connected to a method called "minimal projection" by Klein (1893), (Note: Klein (1893), p. 473) which was later called "isotropy projection" by Blaschke (1926) emphasizing the relation to oriented circles and spheres. For instance, a circle with rectangular coordinates $x, y$ and radius $r$ in R^{2} corresponds to a point in R^{3} with coordinates $x, y, z$. This method was known for some time in circle geometry (though without using the concept of orientation) and can be further differentiated depending on whether the additional coordinate is treated as imaginary or real: $z=ir$ was used by Chasles (1852), Möbius (1857), Cayley (1867), and Darboux (1872); (Note: Darboux (1872), pp. 343-349, 369-383) $z=r$ was used by Cousinery (1826), Druckenmüller (1842), and in the "cyclography" of Fiedler (1882), therefore the latter method was also called "cyclographic projection" – see E. Müller (1910) for a summary. This method was also applied to spheres (Note: Bateman (1912), pp. 328 and 336) by Darboux (1872), (Note: Darboux (1872), p. 366) Lie (1871), or Klein (1893). Let $x, y, z, r$ and $x', y', z', r'$ be the center coordinates and radii of two spheres in three-dimensional space R^{3}. If the spheres are touching each other with same orientation, their equation is given

$$(x-x')^{2}+(y-y')^{2}+(z-z')^{2}-(r-r')^{2}=0$$.

Setting $t=ir$, these coordinates correspond to rectangular coordinates in four-dimensional space R^{4}:

$$(x-x')^{2}+(y-y')^{2}+(z-z')^{2}+(t-t')^{2}=0$$.

In general, Lie (1871) showed that the conformal point transformations in R^{n} (composed of motions, similarities, and transformations by reciprocal radii) correspond in R^{n-1} to those sphere transformations which are contact transformations. (Note: Lie (1871), p. 201ff; Lie (1872), p. 186; Lie & Scheffers (1896), pp. 433–444) Klein (1893) pointed out that by using minimal projection on hexaspherical coordinates, the 15-parameter Lie sphere transformations in R^{3} are simply the projections of the 15-parameter conformal point transformations in R^{4}, whereas the points in R^{4} can be seen as the stereographic projection of the points of a sphere in R^{5}.

=== Relation to electrodynamics ===
Harry Bateman and Ebenezer Cunningham (1909) showed that the electromagnetic equations are not only Lorentz invariant, but also scale and conformal invariant. They are invariant under the 15-parameter group of conformal transformations $G_{15}$ (transformations by reciprocal radii) in R^{4} producing the relation

$$\delta x^{\prime2}+\delta y^{\prime2}+\delta z^{\prime2}+\delta u^{\prime2}=\lambda\left(\delta x^{2}+\delta y^{2}+\delta z^{2}+\delta u^{2}\right)$$,

where $u=ict$ includes $t$ as time component and $c$ as the speed of light. Bateman (1909) also noticed the equivalence to the previously mentioned Lie sphere transformations in R^{3}, because the radius $r$ used in them can be interpreted as the radius $ct$ of a spherical wave contracting or expanding with $c$, therefore he called them "spherical wave transformations". (Note: Bateman (1909), p. 225, 240; (1910b), p. 623) He wrote: (Note: Bateman (1912), p. 358)

When we use Darboux's representation of a point in $S_4$ by a spherical wave in $S_3$, the group $G_{15}$ becomes the group of spherical wave transformations which transform a spherical wave into a spherical wave. This group of transformations has been discussed by S. Lie; it is the group of transformations which transform lines of curvature on a surface enveloped by spherical waves into lines of curvature on the surface enveloped by the corresponding spherical waves.

Depending on $\lambda$ they can be differentiated into subgroups:

(a) $\lambda=1$ correspond to mappings which transform not only spheres into spheres but also planes into planes. These are called Laguerre transformations/inversions forming the Laguerre group, which in physics correspond to the Lorentz transformations forming the 6-parameter Lorentz group or 10-parameter Poincaré group with translations.

(b) $\lambda\ne1$ represents scale or similarity transformations by multiplication of the space-time variables of the Lorentz transformations by a constant factor depending on $\lambda$. For instance, if $l=\sqrt{\lambda}$ is used, then the transformation given by Poincaré in 1905 follows: (Note: Poincaré (1906), p. 132.)

$$x^{\prime}=\gamma l\left(x-vt\right),\quad y^{\prime}=ly,\quad z^{\prime}=lz,\quad t^{\prime}=\gamma l\left(t-x\frac{v}{c^{2}}\right)$$.

However, it was shown by Poincaré and Einstein that only $l=1$ produces a group that is a symmetry of all laws of nature as required by the principle of relativity (the Lorentz group), while the group of scale transformations is only a symmetry of optics and electrodynamics.

(c) Setting $\lambda=r^{4}/\left(x^{2}+y^{2}+z^{2}+u^{2}\right)^{2}$ particularly relates to the wide conformal group of transformations by reciprocal radii. It consists of elementary transformations that represent a generalized inversion into a four-dimensional hypersphere:

$$\begin{align}
x' & =\frac{k^{2}x}{x^{2}+y^{2}+z^{2}+u^{2}},\quad & z' & =\frac{k^{2}z}{x^{2}+y^{2}+z^{2}+u^{2}},\\
y' & =\frac{k^{2}y}{x^{2}+y^{2}+z^{2}+u^{2}}, & u' & =\frac{k^{2}u}{x^{2}+y^{2}+z^{2}+u^{2}},
\end{align}$$

which become real spherical wave transformations in terms of Lie sphere geometry if the real radius $ct$ is used instead of $u=ict$, thus $x^{2}+y^{2}+z^{2}-c^{2}t^{2}$ is given in the denominator.

Felix Klein (1921) pointed out the similarity of these relations to Lie's and his own researches of 1871, adding that the conformal group doesn't have the same meaning as the Lorentz group, because the former applies to electrodynamics whereas the latter is a symmetry of all laws of nature including mechanics. (Note: Klein (1910/21)) The possibility was discussed for some time, whether conformal transformations allow for the transformation into uniformly accelerated frames. Later, conformal invariance became important again in certain areas such as conformal field theory.

=== Lorentz group isomorphic to Möbius group ===
It turns out that also the 6-parameter conformal group of R^{2} (i.e. the Möbius group composed of automorphisms of the Riemann sphere), which in turn is isomorphic to the 6-parameter group of hyperbolic motions (i.e. isometric automorphisms of a hyperbolic space) in R^{3}, can be physically interpreted: It is isomorphic to the Lorentz group.

For instance, Fricke and Klein (1897) started by defining an "absolute" Cayley metric in terms of a one-part curvilinear surface of second degree, which can be represented by a sphere whose interior represents hyperbolic space with the equation

$$z_{1}^{2}+z_{2}^{2}+z_{3}^{2}-z_{4}^{2}=0$$,

where $z_{1},\ z_{2},\ z_{3},\ z_{4}$ are homogeneous coordinates. They pointed out that motions of hyperbolic space into itself also transform this sphere into itself. They developed the corresponding transformation by defining a complex parameter $\xi$ of the sphere

$$\xi=\frac{z_{1}+iz_{2}}{z_{4}-z_{3}}$$

which is connected to another parameter $\xi'$ by the substitution

$$\xi'=\frac{\alpha\xi+\beta}{\gamma\xi+\delta}$$

where $\alpha, \beta, \gamma, \delta$ are complex coefficients. They furthermore showed that by setting $z_{1}:z_{2}:z_{3}:z_{4}=X:Y:Z:1$, the above relations assume the form in terms of the unit sphere in R^{3}:

$$X^{2}+Y^{2}+Z^{2}=1,\quad\xi=\frac{X+iY}{1-Z}$$.

which is identical to the stereographic projection of the $\xi$-plane on a spherical surface already given by Klein in 1884. (Note: Klein (1884), p. 32; (English translation: p. 34)) Since the substitutions $\xi,\xi'$ are Möbius transformations (German: Kreisverwandtschaften) in the $\xi$-plane or upon the $\xi$-sphere, they concluded that by carrying out an arbitrary motion of hyperbolic space in itself, the $\xi$-sphere undergoes a Möbius transformation, that the entire group of hyperbolic motions gives all direct Möbius transformations, and finally that any direct Möbius transformation corresponds to a motion of hyperbolic space.

Based on the work of Fricke & Klein, the isomorphism of that group of hyperbolic motions (and consequently of the Möbius group) to the Lorentz group was demonstrated by Gustav Herglotz (1909). (Note: Herglotz (1909)) Namely, the Minkowski metric corresponds to the above Cayley metric (based on a real conic section), if the spacetime coordinates are identified with the above homogeneous coordinates

$$z_{1}=x,\quad z_{2}=y,\quad z_{3}=z,\quad z_{4}=t$$,

by which the above parameter become

$\mathsf{\xi}=\frac{x+iy}{t-z},\quad\xi'=\frac{x'+iy'}{t'-z'},$ again connected by the substitution $\xi'=\frac{\alpha\xi+\beta}{\gamma\xi+\delta}$.

Herglotz concluded, that any such substitution corresponds to a Lorentz transformation, establishing a one-to-one correspondence to hyperbolic motions in R^{3}. The relation between the Lorentz group and the Cayley metric in hyperbolic space was also pointed out by Klein (1910) (Note: Klein (1910)) as well as Pauli (1921). The corresponding isomorphism of the Möbius group to the Lorentz group was employed, among others, by Roger Penrose.

== Transformation by reciprocal directions ==
=== Development in the 19th century ===
Above, the connection of conformal transformations with coordinates including the radius of spheres within Lie sphere geometry was mentioned. The special case $\lambda=1$ corresponds to a sphere transformation given by Edmond Laguerre (1880–1885), who called it the "transformation by reciprocal directions" and who laid down the foundation of a geometry of oriented spheres and planes. According to Darboux (Note: Darboux (1887), p. 259) and Bateman, similar relations were discussed before by Albert Ribaucour (1870) (Note: Ribaucour (1870)) and by Lie himself (1871). Stephanos (1881) pointed out that Laguerre's geometry is indeed a special case of Lie's sphere geometry. (Note: Stephanos (1881)) He also represented Laguerre's oriented spheres by quaternions (1883). (Note: Stephanos (1883))

Lines, circles, planes, or spheres with radii of certain orientation are called by Laguerre half-lines, half-circles (cycles), half-planes, half-spheres, etc. A tangent is a half-line cutting a cycle at a point where both have the same direction. The transformation by reciprocal directions transforms oriented spheres into oriented spheres and oriented planes into oriented planes, leaving invariant the "tangential distance" of two cycles (the distance between the points of each one of their common tangents), and also conserves the lines of curvature. Laguerre (1882) applied the transformation to two cycles under the following conditions: Their radical axis is the axis of transformation, and their common tangents are parallel to two fixed directions of the half-lines that are transformed into themselves (Laguerre called this specific method the "transformation by reciprocal half-lines", which was later called "Laguerre inversion"). Setting $R$ and $R'$ as the radii of the cycles, and $D$ and $D'$ as the distances of their centers to the axis, he obtained: (Note: Laguerre (1882), p. 550.)

$$D^{2}-D^{\prime2}=R^{2}-R^{\prime2},\quad D-D'=\alpha(R-R'),\quad D+D'=\frac{1}{\alpha}(R+R'),$$

with the transformation: (Note: Laguerre (1882), p. 551.)

$$D'=\frac{D\left(1+\alpha^{2}\right)-2\alpha R}{1-\alpha^{2}},\quad R'=\frac{2\alpha D-R\left(1+\alpha^{2}\right)}{1-\alpha^{2}}.$$

Darboux (1887) obtained the same formulas in different notation (with $z=D$ and $k=\alpha$) in his treatment of the "transformation by reciprocal directions", though he included the $x$ and $y$ coordinates as well: (Note: Darboux (1887), p. 254)

$$\begin{align}
x' & =x,\quad & z' & =\frac{1+k^{2}}{1-k^{2}}z-\frac{2kR}{1-k^{2}},\\
y' & =y, & R' & =\frac{2kz}{1-k^{2}}-\frac{1+k^{2}}{1-k^{2}}R,
\end{align}$$

with

$$z'+R' =\frac{1+k}{1-k}(z-R),\quad z'-R' =\frac{1-k}{1+k}(z+R),$$

consequently he obtained the relation

$$x^{\prime2}+y^{\prime2}+z^{\prime2}-R^{\prime2}=x^{2}+y^{2}+z^{2}-R^{2}$$.

As mentioned above, oriented spheres in R^{3} can be represented by points of four-dimensional space R^{4} using minimal (isotropy) projection, which became particularly important in Laguerre's geometry. For instance, E. Müller (1898) based his discussion of oriented spheres on the fact that they can be mapped upon the points of a plane manifold of four dimensions (which he likened to Fiedler's "cyclography" from 1882). He systematically compared the transformations by reciprocal radii (calling it "inversion at a sphere") with the transformations by reciprocal directions (calling it "inversion at a plane sphere complex"). (Note: E. Müller (1898), see footnote on p. 274.) Following Müller's paper, Smith (1900) discussed Laguerre's transformation and the related "group of the geometry of reciprocal directions". Alluding to Klein's (1893) treatment of minimal projection, he pointed out that this group "is simply isomorphic with the group of all displacements and symmetry transformations in space of four dimensions". (Note: Smith (1900), p. 172) Smith obtained the same transformation as Laguerre and Darboux in different notation, calling it "inversion into a spherical complex": (Note: Smith (1900), p. 159)

$$p'=\frac{\kappa^{2}+1}{\kappa^{2}-1}p-\frac{2\kappa}{\kappa^{2}-1}R,\quad R'=\frac{2\kappa}{\kappa^{2}-1}p-\frac{\kappa^{2}+1}{\kappa^{2}-1}R$$

with the relations

$$\kappa=\frac{R'-R}{p'-p},\quad p^{\prime2}-p^{2}=R^{\prime2}-R^{2}.$$

=== Laguerre inversion and Lorentz transformation ===
In 1905 both Poincaré and Einstein pointed out that the Lorentz transformation of special relativity (setting $c=1$)

$$x'=\frac{x-vt}{\sqrt{1-v^{2}}},\quad y'=y,\quad z'=z,\quad t'=\frac{t-vx}{\sqrt{1-v^{2}}}$$

leaves the relation $x^{2}+y^{2}+z^{2}-t^{2}$ invariant. Einstein stressed the point that by this transformation a spherical light wave in one frame is transformed into a spherical light wave in another one. Poincaré showed that the Lorentz transformation can be seen as a rotation in four-dimensional space with time as fourth coordinate, with Minkowski deepening this insight much further (see History of special relativity).

As shown above, also Laguerre's transformation by reciprocal directions or half-lines – later called Laguerre inversion – in the form given by Darboux (1887) leaves the expression $x^{2}+y^{2}+z^{2}-R^{2}$ invariant. Subsequently, the relation to the Lorentz transformation was noted by several authors. For instance, Bateman (1910) argued that this transformation (which he attributed to Ribaucour) is "identical" to the Lorentz transformation. In particular, he argued (1912) that the variant given by Darboux (1887) corresponds to the Lorentz transformation in $z$ direction, if $R=ct$, $R'=ct'$, and the $k$ terms are replaced by velocities. (Note: Bateman (1912), p. 358) Bateman (1910) also sketched geometric representations of relativistic light spheres using such spherical systems. (Note: Bateman (1910a), see footnote on pp. 5–7) However, Kubota (1925) responded to Bateman by arguing that the Laguerre inversion is involutory whereas the Lorentz transformation is not. He concluded that in order to make them equivalent, the Laguerre inversion has to be combined with a reversal of direction of the cycles. (Note: Kubota (1925), see footnote on p. 162.)

The specific relation between the Lorentz transformation and the Laguerre inversion can also be demonstrated as follows (see H.R. Müller (1948) (Note: H.R. Müller (1948), p. 349) for analogous formulas in different notation). Laguerre's inversion formulas from 1882 (equivalent to those of Darboux in 1887) read:

$$D'=\frac{D\left(1+\alpha^{2}\right)-2\alpha R}{1-\alpha^{2}},\quad R'=\frac{2\alpha D-R\left(1+\alpha^{2}\right)}{1-\alpha^{2}}.$$

by setting

$$\frac{2\alpha}{1+\alpha^{2}}=w$$

it follows

$$\frac{1-\alpha^{2}}{1+\alpha^{2}}=\sqrt{1-w^{2}},\quad\frac{2\alpha}{1-\alpha^{2}}=\frac{w}{\sqrt{1-w^{2}}},$$

finally by setting $D=x,D'=x',R=t,R'=t'$ the Laguerre inversion becomes very similar to the Lorentz transformation except that the expression $t-vx$ is reversed into $wx-t$:

$$x'=\frac{x-wt}{\sqrt{1-w^{2}}},\quad t'=\frac{wx-t}{\sqrt{1-w^{2}}}$$.

According to Müller, the Lorentz transformation can be seen as the product of an even number of such Laguerre inversions that change the sign. First an inversion is conducted into plane $\pi_1$ which is inclined with respect to plane $\pi$ under a certain angle, followed by another inversion back to $\pi$. See section #Laguerre group isomorphic to Lorentz group for more details of the connection between the Laguerre inversion to other variants of Laguerre transformations.

=== Lorentz transformation within Laguerre geometry ===
Timerding (1911) (Note: Timerding (1911), p. 285) used Laguerre's concept of oriented spheres in order to represent and derive the Lorentz transformation. Given a sphere of radius $r$, with $x$ as the distance between its center and the central plane, he obtained the relations to a corresponding sphere

$$x'+r'=\sqrt{\frac{1+\lambda^{2}}{1-\lambda^{2}}}(x+r),\quad\frac{x'-r'}{x'+r'}=\frac{1-\lambda}{1+\lambda}\cdot\frac{x-r}{x+r},$$

resulting in the transformation

$$\sqrt{1-\lambda^{2}}\cdot x'=x-\lambda r,\quad\sqrt{1-\lambda^{2}}\cdot r'=r-\lambda x.$$

By setting $\lambda=v/c$ and $r=ct$, it becomes the Lorentz transformation.

Following Timerding and Bateman, Ogura (1913) analyzed a Laguerre transformation of the form (Note: Ogura (1913), p. 107)

$$\alpha'=\alpha\frac{1}{\sqrt{1-\lambda^{2}}}-R\frac{\lambda}{\sqrt{1-\lambda^{2}}},\quad\beta'=\beta,\quad\gamma'=\gamma,\quad R'=\alpha\frac{-\lambda}{\sqrt{1-\lambda^{2}}}+R\frac{1}{\sqrt{1-\lambda^{2}}}$$,

which become the Lorentz transformation with

$$\begin{align}
x & =\alpha, & y & =\beta, & z & =\gamma, & R & =ct,\\
x' & =\alpha', & y' & =\beta', & z' & =\gamma', & R' & =ct',
\end{align}$$
$\lambda=\frac{v}{c}$.

He stated that "the Laguerre transformation in sphere manifoldness is equivalent to the Lorentz transformation in spacetime manifoldness".

=== Laguerre group isomorphic to Lorentz group ===
As shown above, the group of conformal point transformations in R^{n} (composed of motions, similarities, and inversions) can be related by minimal projection to the group of contact transformations in R^{n-1} transforming circles or spheres into other circles or spheres. In addition, Lie (1871, 1896) pointed out that in R^{3} there is a 7-parameter subgroup of point transformations composed of motions and similarities, which by using minimal projection corresponds to a 7-parameter subgroup of contact transformations in R^{2} transforming circles into circles. (Note: Lie (1871), p. 201ff; Lie (1872), pp. 180–186; Lie & Scheffers (1896), p. 443) These relations were further studied by Smith (1900), Blaschke (1910), (Note: Blaschke (1910)) Coolidge (1916) and others, who pointed out the connection to Laguerre's geometry of reciprocal directions related to oriented lines, circles, planes and spheres. Therefore, Smith (1900) called it the "group of the geometry of reciprocal directions", and Blaschke (1910) used the expression "Laguerre group". The "extended Laguerre group" consists of motions and similarities, having 7 parameters in R^{2} transforming oriented lines and circles, or 11 parameters in R^{3} transforming oriented planes and spheres. If similarities are excluded, it becomes the "restricted Laguerre group" having 6 parameters in R^{2} and 10 parameters in R^{3}, consisting of orientation-preserving or orientation-reversing motions, and preserving the tangential distance between oriented circles or spheres. (Note: Blaschke (1910), p. 11–13) Subsequently, it became common that the term Laguerre group only refers to the restricted Laguerre group. It was also noted that the Laguerre group is part of a wider group conserving tangential distances, called the "equilong group" by Scheffers (1905). (Note: Blaschke (1910), p. 13)

In R^{2} the Laguerre group leaves invariant the relation $dx^{2}+dy^{2}-dr^{2}$, which can be extended to arbitrary R^{n} as well. For instance, in R^{3} it leaves invariant the relation $dx^{2}+dy^{2}+dz^{2}-dr^{2}$. This is equivalent to relation $dx^{2}+dy^{2}+dz^{2}+dr^{2}$ in R^{4} by using minimal (isotropy) projection with imaginary radius coordinate, or cyclographic projection (in descriptive geometry) with real radius coordinate. The transformations forming the Laguerre group can be further differentiated into "direct Laguerre transformations" which are related to motions preserving both the tangential distance as well as the sign; or "indirect Laguerre transformations" which are related to orientation-reversing motions, preserving the tangential distance with the sign reversed. The Laguerre inversion first given by Laguerre in 1882 is involutory, thus it belongs to the indirect Laguerre transformations. Laguerre himself did not discuss the group related to his inversion, but it turned out that every Laguerre transformation can be generated by at most four Laguerre inversions and every direct Laguerre transformation is the product of two involutory transformations, thus Laguerre inversions are of special importance because they are generating operators of the entire Laguerre group. (Note: Blaschke (1910), p. 15)

It was noted that the Laguerre group is indeed isomorphic to the Lorentz group (or the Poincaré group if translations are included), as both groups leave invariant the form $dx_{1}^{2}+dx_{2}^{2}+dx_{3}^{2}-dx_{4}^{2}$. After the first comparison of the Lorentz transformation and the Laguerre inversion by Bateman (1910) as mentioned above, the equivalence of both groups was pointed out by Cartan in 1912 (Note: Cartan (1912), p. 23) and 1914, (Note: Cartan (1914), pp. 452–457) and he expanded upon it in 1915 (published 1955) in the French version of Klein's encyclopedia. Also Poincaré (1912, published 1921) wrote:

Mr. Cartan has recently given a curious example. We know the importance in mathematical physics of what has been called the Lorentz group; it is this group upon which our new ideas on the principle of relativity and the dynamics of the electron are based. On the other hand, Laguerre once introduced into geometry a group of transformations that change the spheres into spheres. These two groups are isomorphic, so that mathematically these two theories, one physical, the other one geometric, show no essential difference. (Note: Poincare (1912), p. 145: M. Cartan en a donné récemment un exemple curieux. On connaît l’importance en Physique Mathématique de ce qu’on a appelé le groupe de Lorentz; c’est sur ce groupe que reposent nos idées nouvelles sur le principe de relativité et sur la Dynamique de l’Electron. D’un autre côté, Laguerre a autrefois introduit en géométrie un groupe de transformations qui changent les sphères en sphères. Ces deux groupes sont isomorphes, de sorte que mathématiquement ces deux théories, l’une physique, l’autre géométrique, ne présentent pas de différence essentielle.)

— Henri Poincaré, 1912

Others who noticed this connection include Coolidge (1916), Klein & Blaschke (1926), Blaschke (1929), H.R. Müller, (Note: H.R. Müller (1948), p. 338) Kunle & Fladt (1970), Benz (1992). It was recently pointed out:

A Laguerre transformation (L-transform) is a mapping which is bijective on the sets of oriented planes and oriented spheres, respectively, and preserves tangency between plane and sphere. L-transforms are more easily understood if we use the so-called cyclographic model of Laguerre geometry. There, an oriented sphere $S$ is represented as point $\mathbf{S}\operatorname{\text{:=}}(\mathbf{m},R)\in\mathbb{R}^{4}$. An oriented plane $P$ in $E^{3}$ may be interpreted as the set of all oriented spheres which are tangent to $P$. Mapping $P$ via this set of spheres into $\mathbb{R}^{4}$, one finds a hyperplane in $\mathbb{R}^{4}$ which is parallel to a tangent hyperplane of the cone $x_{1}^{2}+x_{2}^{2}+x_{3}^{2}-x_{4}^{2}=0$. In the cyclographic model, an L-transform is seen as a special affine map (Lorentz transformation),...

— Pottmann, Grohs, Mitra (2009)

== See also ==
- History of Lorentz transformations

== Primary sources ==
- Bateman, Harry (1909) [1908]. "The conformal transformations of a space of four dimensions and their applications to geometrical optics" . Proceedings of the London Mathematical Society. 7: 70–89. doi:10.1112/plms/s2-7.1.70.
- Bateman, Harry (1910) [1909]. "The Transformation of the Electrodynamical Equations" . Proceedings of the London Mathematical Society. 8: 223–264. doi:10.1112/plms/s2-8.1.223.
- Bateman, Harry (1910a). "The Physical Aspect of Time" . Manchester Memoirs. 54 (14): 1–13.
- Bateman, Harry (1910b). "The Relation between Electromagnetism and Geometry". Philosophical Magazine. 20 (118): 623–628. doi:10.1080/14786441008636944.
- Bateman, Harry (1912) [1910]. "Some geometrical theorems connected with Laplace's equation and the equation of wave motion". American Journal of Mathematics. 34 (3): 325–360. doi:10.2307/2370223. JSTOR 2370223.
- Blaschke, Wilhelm (1910). "Untersuchungen über die Geometrie der Speere in der Euklidischen Geometrie". Monatshefte für Mathematik und Physik. 21 (1): 3–60. doi:10.1007/bf01693218. S2CID 120182503.
- Cartan, Élie (1912). "Sur les groupes de transformation de contact et la Cinématique nouvelle". Société de Mathématique the France - Comptes Rendus des Séances: 23.
- Cartan, Élie (1914). "La théorie des groupes". Revue du Mois: 452–457.
- Cunningham, Ebenezer (1910) [1909]. "The principle of Relativity in Electrodynamics and an Extension Thereof". Proceedings of the London Mathematical Society. 8: 77–98. doi:10.1112/plms/s2-8.1.77.
- Darboux, Gaston (1872). "Sur les relations entre les groupes de points, de cercles et de sphères". Annales Scientifiques de l'École Normale Supérieure. 1: 323–392. doi:10.24033/asens.87.
- Darboux, Gaston (1878). "Mémoire sur la théorie des coordonnées curvilignes et des systèmes orthogonaux. Troisième partie". Annales Scientifiques de l'École Normale Supérieure. 7: 275–348. doi:10.24033/asens.164.
- Darboux, Gaston (1887). Leçons sur la théorie générale des surfaces. Première partie. Paris: Gauthier-Villars.
- Herglotz, Gustav (1910) [1909], "Über den vom Standpunkt des Relativitätsprinzips aus als starr zu bezeichnenden Körper" [Wikisource translation: On bodies that are to be designated as "rigid" from the standpoint of the relativity principle], Annalen der Physik, 336 (2): 393–415, Bibcode:1910AnP...336..393H, doi:10.1002/andp.19103360208
- Felix Klein (1884), Vorlesungen über das Ikosaeder und die Auflösung der Gleichungen vom fünften Grade, Teubner, Leipzig; English translation: Lectures on the ikosahedron and the solution of equations of the fifth degree (1888)
- Klein, Felix (1921). "Über die geometrischen Grundlagen der Lorentzgruppe". Gesammelte Mathematische Abhandlungen . Vol. 19. pp. 533–552. doi:10.1007/978-3-642-51960-4_31 (inactive 12 July 2025). ISBN 978-3-642-51898-0. ; Reprinted in Klein, Felix (1921). "Über die geometrischen Grundlagen der Lorentzgruppe". Gesammelte Mathematische Abhandlungen. Vol. 1. pp. 533–552. doi:10.1007/978-3-642-51960-4_31 (inactive 12 July 2025). ISBN 978-3-642-51898-0. English translation by David Delphenich: On the geometric foundations of the Lorentz group
- Kubota, Tadahiko (1925). "Über die (2-2)-deutigen quadratischen Verwandtschaften V". Science Reports of the Tôhoku Imperial University. 14: 155–164..
- Laguerre, Edmond (1881). "Sur la transformation par directions réciproques" . Comptes Rendus. 92: 71–73.
- Laguerre, Edmond (1882). "Transformations par semi-droites réciproques" . Nouvelles annales de mathématiques. 1: 542–556.
- Laguerre, Edmond (1905). "Collection of papers published between 1880 and 1885". Œuvres de Laguerre, vol. 2. Paris: Gauthier-Villars. pp. 592–684.
- Lie, Sophus (1871). "Ueber diejenige Theorie eines Raumes mit beliebig vielen Dimensionen, die der Krümmungs-Theorie des gewöhnlichen Raumes entspricht". Göttinger Nachrichten: 191–209.
- Lie, Sophus (1872). "Ueber Complexe, insbesondere Linien- und Kugel-Complexe, mit Anwendung auf die Theorie partieller Differentialgleichungen". Mathematische Annalen. 5: 145–256. doi:10.1007/bf01446331. S2CID 122317672. English translation by David Delphenich: On complexes - in particular, line and sphere complexes - with applications to the theory of partial differential equations
- Lie, Sophus; Scheffers, Georg (1896). Geometrie der Berührungstransformationen. Leipzig: B.G. Teubner.
- Liouville, Joseph (1847). "Note au sujet de l'article précédent". Journal de Mathématiques Pures et Appliquées. 12: 265–290.
- Liouville, Joseph (1850a). "Théorème sur l'équation dx²+dy²+dz²=λ(dα²+dβ²+dγ²)". Journal de Mathématiques Pures et Appliquées. 15: 103.
- Liouville, Joseph (1850b). "Extension au cas des trois dimensions de la question du tracé géographique". In Gaspard Monge (ed.). Application de l'analyse à la Géométrie. Paris: Bachelier. pp. 609–616.
- Müller, Emil (1898). "Die Geometrie orientierter Kugeln nach Grassmann'schen Methoden". Monatshefte für Mathematik und Physik. 9 (1): 269–315. doi:10.1007/bf01707874. S2CID 121786469.
- Müller, Hans Robert (1948). "Zyklographische Betrachtung der Kinematik der speziellen Relativitätstheorie". Monatshefte für Mathematik und Physik. 52 (4): 337–353. doi:10.1007/bf01525338. S2CID 120150204.
- Ogura, Kinnosuke (1913). "On the Lorentz Transformation with some Geometrical Interpretations". Science Reports of the Tôhuku University. 2: 95–116.
- Poincaré, Henri (1906) [1905], "Sur la dynamique de l'électron" [Wikisource translation: On the Dynamics of the Electron], Rendiconti del Circolo Matematico di Palermo, 21: 129–176, Bibcode:1906RCMP...21..129P, doi:10.1007/BF03013466, S2CID 120211823
- Poincaré, Henri (1921) [1912]. "Rapport sur les travaux de M. Cartan (fait à la Faculté des sciences de l'Université de Paris)". Acta Mathematica. 38 (1): 137–145. doi:10.1007/bf02392064. S2CID 122517182.. Written by Poincaré in 1912, printed in Acta Mathematica in 1914 though belatedly published in 1921.
- Ribaucour, Albert (1870). "Sur la déformation des surfaces" . Comptes Rendus. 70: 330–333.
- Smith, Percey F. (1900). "On a Transformation of Laguerre". Annals of Mathematics. 1 (1/4): 153–172. doi:10.2307/1967282. JSTOR 1967282.
- Stephanos, C. (1881). "Sur la géométrie des sphères". Comptes Rendus. 92: 1195–1197.
- Stephanos, C. (1883). "Sur la théorie des quaternions". Mathematische Annalen. 7 (4): 589–592. doi:10.1007/bf01443267. S2CID 179178015.
- Timerding, H. E. (1912). "Über ein einfaches geometrisches Bild der Raumzeitwelt Minkowskis". Jahresbericht der Deutschen Mathematiker-Vereinigung. 21: 274–285.

== Secondary sources ==
Textbooks, encyclopaedic entries, historical surveys:

- Bateman, Harry (1915). The mathematical analysis of electrical and optical wave motion on the basis of Maxwell's equations. Cambridge: University Press.
- Benz, Walter (2005) [1992]. Classical Geometries in Modern Contexts: Geometry of Real Inner Product Spaces Third Edition. Springer. pp. 133–175. ISBN 978-3034804202.
- Blaschke, Wilhelm (1929). Thomsen, Gerhard (ed.). Vorlesungen über Differentialgeometrie und geometrische Grundlagen von Einsteins Relativitätstheorie Bd. 3. Berlin: Springer. doi:10.1007/978-3-642-50823-3. hdl:2027/mdp.39015017405492. ISBN 978-3-642-50513-3.
- Cartan, Élie; Fano, Gino (1915). "La théorie des groupes continus et la géométrie". Encyclopédie des Sciences Mathématiques Pures et Appliquées. Vol. 3. pp. 39–43. (Only pages 1–21 were published in 1915, the entire article including pp. 39–43 concerning the groups of Laguerre and Lorentz was posthumously published in 1955 in Cartan's collected papers, and was reprinted in the Encyclopédie in 1991.)
- Cecil, Thomas E. (2008) [1992], "Laguerre geometry", Lie sphere geometry, Springer, pp. 37–46, ISBN 978-0387746555
- Coolidge, Julian (1916). A treatise on the circle and the sphere. Oxford: Clarendon Press.
- Cunningham, Ebenezer (1914). The principle of relativity. Cambridge: University Press.
- Fano, Gino (1910). "Kontinuierliche Geometrische Gruppen. Die Gruppentheorie als Geometrisches Einteilungsprinzip". Encyklopädie der Mathematischen Wissenschaften mit Einschluss ihrer Anwendungen. Vol. 3.1.1. pp. 289–388. doi:10.1007/978-3-663-16027-4_5. ISBN 978-3-663-15456-3.
- Robert Fricke & Felix Klein (1897), Vorlesungen über die Theorie der autormorphen Functionen - Erster Band: Die gruppentheoretischen Grundlagen, Teubner, Leipzig
- Kastrup, H. A. (2008). "On the advancements of conformal transformations and their associated symmetries in geometry and theoretical physics". Annalen der Physik. 520 (9–10): 631–690. arXiv:0808.2730. Bibcode:2008AnP...520..631K. doi:10.1002/andp.200810324. S2CID 12020510.
- Klein, Felix (1893). Einleitung in die höhere Geometrie I. Göttingen: GÃ¶ttingen.
- Klein, Felix; Blaschke, Wilhelm (1926). Vorlesungen über höhere Geometrie. Berlin: Springer. (Klein's lectures from 1893 updated and edited by Blaschke in 1926.)
- Kunle H.; Fladt K. (1926). "Erlangen program and higher geometry – Laguerre geometry". In Heinrich Behnke (ed.). Fundamentals of Mathematics: Geometry. MIT Press. pp. 460–516.
- Müller, Emil (1910). "Die Verschiedenen Koordinatensysteme". Encyklopädie der Mathematischen Wissenschaften mit Einschluss ihrer Anwendungen. Vol. 3.1.1. pp. 596–770. doi:10.1007/978-3-663-16027-4_9. ISBN 978-3-663-15456-3.
- Pedoe, Daniel (1972). "A forgotten geometrical transformation". L'Enseignement Mathématique. 18: 255–267. doi:10.5169/seals-45376.
- Rougé, André (2008). Relativité restreinte: la contribution d'Henri Poincaré. Editions Ecole Polytechnique. ISBN 978-2730215251.
- Walter, Scott A. (2018). "Figures of light in the early history of relativity (1905-1914)". In Rowe, David; et al. (eds.). Beyond Einstein. Einstein Studies. Vol. 14. Basel: Birkhäuser. pp. 1–50. doi:10.1007/978-1-4939-7708-6_1. ISBN 978-1-4939-7706-2.
- Warwick, Andrew (1992). "Cambridge mathematics and Cavendish physics: Cunningham, Campbell and Einstein's relativity 1905–1911 Part I: The uses of theory". Studies in History and Philosophy of Science Part A. 23 (4): 625–656. Bibcode:1992SHPSA..23..625W. doi:10.1016/0039-3681(92)90015-X.
- Warwick, Andrew (2003). Masters of Theory: Cambridge and the Rise of Mathematical Physics. Chicago: University of Chicago Press. ISBN 978-0-226-87375-6.
