= Conformal symmetry =

Extension of Poincaré spacetime symmetry

In physics, a system is said to have conformal symmetry if it is invariant under transformations of spacetime which preserve angles but do not necessarily preserve distances or spacetime intervals, known as conformal transformations. Conformal symmetry is an extension of the more well-known Poincaré symmetry of special relativity which consists of transformations which preserve both angles and spacetime intervals, those being namely rotations, spatial translations, time-translations, and Lorentz transformations (also known as boosts). In addition to these symmetries, conformal symmetry encompasses dilations and special conformal transformations. Formally, Poincaré transformations are the isometries of Minkowski spacetime, meaning that they preserve the Minkowski metric, while conformal transformations may rescale it, preserving only its conformal class.

The conformal transformations form a group known as the conformal group; since these transformations are continuous, the conformal group is a Lie group. In Minkowski spacetime with three spatial dimensions and one temporal dimension, the conformal group has 15 degrees of freedom: ten for the Poincaré symmetries, four for special conformal transformations, and one for a dilation.

Harry Bateman and Ebenezer Cunningham were the first to study the conformal symmetry of Maxwell's equations. They called a generic expression of conformal symmetry a spherical wave transformation. In modern physics, models with conformal symmetry are studied in both high-energy and condensed matter physics; they often describe critical phenomena, appearing as fixed points in renormalisation group flow and at phase transitions.

== Lie algebra ==
The Lie algebra of the conformal group has the following presentation:

$$\begin{align} & M_{\mu\nu} \equiv i(x_\mu\partial_\nu-x_\nu\partial_\mu) \,, \\
&P_\mu \equiv-i\partial_\mu \,, \\
&D \equiv-ix_\mu\partial^\mu \,, \\
&K_\mu \equiv i(x^2\partial_\mu-2x_\mu x_\nu\partial^\nu) \,, \end{align}$$

where $M_{\mu\nu}$ are the generators of the Lorentz group, $P_\mu$ are the generators of (spatial and temporal) translations, $D$ is the generator of the scaling transformations (also known as dilatations or dilations) and $K_\mu$ are the generators of special conformal transformations.

The commutation relations are as follows:

$$\begin{align} &[D,K_\mu]= -iK_\mu \,, \\
&[D,P_\mu]= iP_\mu \,, \\
&[K_\mu,P_\nu]=2i (\eta_{\mu\nu}D-M_{\mu\nu}) \,, \\
&[K_\mu, M_{\nu\rho}] = i ( \eta_{\mu\nu} K_{\rho} - \eta_{\mu \rho} K_\nu ) \,, \\
&[P_\rho,M_{\mu\nu}] = i(\eta_{\rho\mu}P_\nu - \eta_{\rho\nu}P_\mu) \,, \\
&[M_{\mu\nu},M_{\rho\sigma}] = i (\eta_{\nu\rho}M_{\mu\sigma} + \eta_{\mu\sigma}M_{\nu\rho} - \eta_{\mu\rho}M_{\nu\sigma} - \eta_{\nu\sigma}M_{\mu\rho})\,, \end{align}$$

and all other commutators vanish. Here $\eta_{\mu\nu}$ is the Minkowski metric tensor. In particular, $D$ is a scalar and $K_\mu$ is a covariant vector under the Lorentz transformations.

== Special conformal transformations ==
The special conformal transformations are given by

$$x^\mu \to \frac{x^\mu-a^\mu x^2}{1 - 2a\cdot x + a^2 x^2}$$

where $a^{\mu}$ is a parameter describing the transformation. This special conformal transformation can also be written as $x^\mu \to x'^\mu$, where

$$\frac{{x}'^\mu}{{x'}^2}= \frac{x^\mu}{x^2} - a^\mu,$$

which shows that it consists of an inversion transformation, followed by a translation, followed by a second inversion.

A coordinate grid prior to a special conformal transformation

The same grid after a special conformal transformation

== Geometrical description ==
In two-dimensional spacetime, theories are often considered which are invariant under local conformal transformations, which by the Riemann mapping theorem are extremely rich — indeed, their Lie algebra is infinite-dimensional in contrast to the finite-dimensional algebra of global conformal transformations. In higher dimensions, Liouville's theorem on conformal mappings essentially says that all local conformal transformations extend to one of the global types already discussed above. This means that two-dimensional conformal field theory differs significantly from conformal field theory in higher dimensions,

In more than two dimensions, Euclidean conformal transformations map circles to circles, and hyperspheres to hyperspheres with a straight line considered a degenerate circle and a hyperplane a degenerate hypercircle (i.e. they are Möbius transformations).

In more than two Lorentzian dimensions, conformal transformations map null rays to null rays and light cones to light cones, with a null hyperplane being a degenerate light cone.

== Applications ==
=== Conformal field theory ===
In relativistic quantum field theories, the possibility of symmetries is strictly restricted by Coleman–Mandula theorem under physically reasonable assumptions. The largest possible global symmetry group of a non-supersymmetric interacting field theory is a direct product of the conformal group with an internal group. Such theories are known as conformal field theories.

=== Second-order phase transitions ===
One particular application involves critical phenomena in systems with local interactions. At the critical point, the fluctuations become conformally invariant, meaning they look the same regardless of scale or local stretching. That allows for classification of universality classes of phase transitions in terms of conformal field theories.

Conformal invariance is also present in two-dimensional turbulence at high Reynolds number.

=== High-energy physics ===
Many theories studied in high-energy physics admit conformal symmetry due to it typically being implied by local scale invariance. A famous example is d=4, N=4 supersymmetric Yang–Mills theory due its relevance for AdS/CFT correspondence. Also, the worldsheet in string theory is described by a two-dimensional conformal field theory coupled to two-dimensional gravity.

== Mathematical proofs of conformal invariance in lattice models ==
Physicists have found that many lattice models become conformally invariant in the critical limit. However, mathematical proofs of these results have only appeared much later, and only in some cases.

In 2010, the mathematician Stanislav Smirnov was awarded the Fields Medal "for the proof of conformal invariance of percolation and the planar Ising model in statistical physics".

In 2020, the mathematician Hugo Duminil-Copin and his collaborators proved that rotational invariance exists at the boundary between phases in many physical systems.

== See also ==
- Coleman–Mandula theorem
- Conformal field theory
- Conformal group
- Conformal Killing equation
- Conformal map
- Renormalization group
- Scale invariance
- Superconformal algebra

== Sources ==
- Di Francesco, Philippe; Mathieu, Pierre; Sénéchal, David (1997). Conformal Field Theory. Springer Science & Business Media. ISBN 978-0-387-94785-3.
