= Conformal group =

Concept in mathematical group theory

In mathematics, the conformal group of a space is the group of one-to-one transformations from the space to itself that preserve angles, that is, the conformal transformations on that space. More formally, it is the symmetry group of the conformal structure of the space. Conformal groups include isometries (the distance-preserving transformations), but also angle-preserving transformations such as homotheties (dilations) and special conformal transformations which do not preserve distances.

Important conformal groups include the following:

- The conformal orthogonal group. If V is a vector space with a quadratic form Q, then the conformal orthogonal group CO(V, Q) is the group of linear transformations T of V for which there exists a scalar λ such that for all x in V
  $$Q(Tx) = \lambda^2 Q(x)$$

For a nondegenerate quadratic form, the conformal orthogonal group is equal to the orthogonal group times the group of dilations with positive scale factor.

- The conformal group of the sphere is generated by the inversions in circles. This group is also known as the Möbius group.
- In Euclidean space E^{n}, n > 2, the conformal group is generated by inversions in hyperspheres.
- In a pseudo-Euclidean space E^{p,q}, the conformal group is Conf(p, q) ≃ O(p + 1, q + 1) / Z_{2}.

Conformal groups can be defined for a number of different types of space with notions of angle, including inner product spaces and Riemannian manifolds; the precise definition of the conformal group is dependent on which geometric structure one is considering. For example, when considering $\mathbb{R}^n$, one gets a slightly different conformal group depending on where one considers it as an inner product space, a Riemannian manifold or as Euclidean space (see the definition of the conformal orthogonal group above and the § Mathematical definition section below). All conformal groups are Lie groups.

== Angle analysis ==
In Euclidean geometry one can expect the standard circular angle to be characteristic, but in pseudo-Euclidean space there is also the hyperbolic angle. In the study of special relativity the various frames of reference, for varying velocity with respect to a rest frame, are related by rapidity, a hyperbolic angle. One way to describe a Lorentz boost is as a hyperbolic rotation which preserves the differential angle between rapidities. Thus, they are conformal transformations with respect to the hyperbolic angle.

A method to generate an appropriate conformal group is to mimic the steps of the Möbius group as the conformal group of the ordinary complex plane. Pseudo-Euclidean geometry is supported by alternative complex planes where points are split-complex numbers or dual numbers. Just as the Möbius group requires the Riemann sphere, a compact space, for a complete description, so the alternative complex planes require compactification for complete description of conformal mapping. Nevertheless, the conformal group in each case is given by linear fractional transformations on the appropriate plane.

== Mathematical definition ==
Given a (Pseudo-)Riemannian manifold $M$ with conformal class $[g]$, the conformal group $\text{Conf}(M)$ is the group of conformal maps from $M$ to itself.

More concretely, this is the group of angle-preserving smooth maps from $M$ to itself. However, when the signature of $[g]$ is not definite, the 'angle' is a hyper-angle which is potentially infinite.

For Pseudo-Euclidean space, the definition is slightly different. $\text{Conf}(p,q)$ is the conformal group of the manifold arising from conformal compactification of the pseudo-Euclidean space $\mathbf{E}^{p, q}$ (sometimes identified with $\mathbb{R}^{p,q}$ after a choice of orthonormal basis). This conformal compactification can be defined using $S^p\times S^q$, considered as a submanifold of null points in $\mathbb{R}^{p+1, q+1}$ by the inclusion $(\mathbf{x}, \mathbf{t})\mapsto X = (\mathbf{x}, \mathbf{t})$ (where $X$ is considered as a single spacetime vector). The conformal compactification is then $S^p\times S^q$ with 'antipodal points' identified. This happens by projectivising the space $\mathbb{R}^{p+1,q+1}$. If $N^{p,q}$ is the conformal compactification, then $\text{Conf}(p,q) := \text{Conf}(N^{p,q})$. In particular, this group includes inversion of $\mathbb{R}^{p,q}$, which is not a map from $\mathbb{R}^{p,q}$ to itself as it maps the origin to infinity, and maps infinity to the origin.

== Lie algebra of the conformal group ==
For Pseudo-Euclidean space $\mathbb{R}^{p,q}$, the Lie algebra of the conformal group is given by the basis $\{M_{\mu\nu}, P_\mu, K_\mu, D\}$ with the following commutation relations:
$$\begin{align} &[D,K_\mu]= -iK_\mu \,, \\
&[D,P_\mu]= iP_\mu \,, \\
&[K_\mu,P_\nu]=2i (\eta_{\mu\nu}D-M_{\mu\nu}) \,, \\
&[K_\mu, M_{\nu\rho}] = i ( \eta_{\mu\nu} K_{\rho} - \eta_{\mu \rho} K_\nu ) \,, \\
&[P_\rho,M_{\mu\nu}] = i(\eta_{\rho\mu}P_\nu - \eta_{\rho\nu}P_\mu) \,, \\
&[M_{\mu\nu},M_{\rho\sigma}] = i (\eta_{\nu\rho}M_{\mu\sigma} + \eta_{\mu\sigma}M_{\nu\rho} - \eta_{\mu\rho}M_{\nu\sigma} - \eta_{\nu\sigma}M_{\mu\rho})\,, \end{align}$$
and with all other brackets vanishing. Here $\eta_{\mu\nu}$ is the Minkowski metric.

In fact, this Lie algebra is isomorphic to the Lie algebra of the Lorentz group with one more space and one more time dimension, that is, $\mathfrak{conf}(p,q) \cong \mathfrak{so}(p+1, q+1)$. It can be easily checked that the dimensions agree. To exhibit an explicit isomorphism, define
$$\begin{align} &J_{\mu\nu} = M_{\mu\nu} \,, \\
&J_{-1, \mu} = \frac{1}{2}(P_\mu - K_\mu) \,, \\
&J_{0, \mu} = \frac{1}{2}(P_\mu + K_\mu) \,, \\
&J_{-1, 0} = D.
\end{align}$$
It can then be shown that the generators $J_{ab}$ with $a, b = -1, 0, \cdots, n = p+q$ obey the Lorentz algebra relations with metric $\tilde \eta_{ab} = \operatorname{diag}(-1, +1, -1, \cdots, -1, +1, \cdots, +1)$.

== Conformal group in two spacetime dimensions ==
For two-dimensional Euclidean space or one-plus-one dimensional spacetime, the space of conformal symmetries is much larger. In physics it is sometimes said the conformal group is infinite-dimensional, but this is not quite correct as while the Lie algebra of local symmetries is infinite dimensional, these do not necessarily extend to a Lie group of well-defined global symmetries.

For spacetime dimension $n > 2$, the local conformal symmetries all extend to global symmetries. For $n = 2$ Euclidean space, after changing to a complex coordinate $z = x + iy$ local conformal symmetries are described by the infinite dimensional space of vector fields of the form
$$l_n = -z^{n+1}\partial_z.$$
Hence the local conformal symmetries of 2d Euclidean space is the infinite-dimensional Witt algebra.

== Conformal group of spacetime ==
In 1908, Harry Bateman and Ebenezer Cunningham, two young researchers at University of Liverpool, broached the idea of a conformal group of spacetime They argued that the kinematics groups are perforce conformal as they preserve the quadratic form of spacetime and are akin to orthogonal transformations, though with respect to an isotropic quadratic form. The liberties of an electromagnetic field are not confined to kinematic motions, but rather are required only to be locally proportional to a transformation preserving the quadratic form. Harry Bateman's paper in 1910 studied the Jacobian matrix of a transformation that preserves the light cone and showed it had the conformal property (proportional to a form preserver). Bateman and Cunningham showed that this conformal group is "the largest group of transformations leaving Maxwell’s equations structurally invariant." The conformal group of spacetime has been denoted C(1,3)

Isaak Yaglom has contributed to the mathematics of spacetime conformal transformations in split-complex and dual numbers. Since split-complex numbers and dual numbers form rings, not fields, the linear fractional transformations require a projective line over a ring to be bijective mappings.

It has been traditional since the work of Ludwik Silberstein in 1914 to use the ring of biquaternions to represent the Lorentz group. For the spacetime conformal group, it is sufficient to consider linear fractional transformations on the projective line over that ring. Elements of the spacetime conformal group were called spherical wave transformations by Bateman. The particulars of the spacetime quadratic form study have been absorbed into Lie sphere geometry.

Commenting on the continued interest shown in physical science, A. O. Barut wrote in 1985, "One of the prime reasons for the interest in the conformal group is that it is perhaps the most important of the larger groups containing the Poincaré group."

== See also ==
- Conformal map
- Conformal symmetry
