= Vladimir Ignatowski =

Russian physicist

Ignatowski

Vladimir Sergeyevitch Ignatowski, or Waldemar Sergius von Ignatowsky and similar names in other publications (* March 8/20, 1875 in Tbilisi, Georgia; † January 30, 1942 in Leningrad), was a Russian physicist.

== Life and work ==
Ignatowski graduated in 1906 in Saint Petersburg. 1906-1908 he continued to study at the University of Giessen, with his dissertation in 1909. 1911-1914 he taught at the Higher Technical School in Berlin. Afterwards he worked for different institutions in the Soviet Union. Then he became a corresponding member of the Soviet Academy of Sciences.

Aleksandr Solzhenitsyn reported in his book The Gulag Archipelago, that Ignatowski was put under arrest by Soviet officials, who raised absurd allegations against him. It was claimed that Ignatowski was recruited by the German secret service in 1909, not to spy in the next war (World War I), but to spy in the "war after the next war" (World War II). So Ignatowski was executed in 1942 in Leningrad. He was rehabilitated in 1955.

Ignatowski wrote some papers on special relativity. In 1910 he was the first to try to derive the Lorentz transformation by group theory only using the relativity principle, and without the postulate of the constancy of the speed of light (1910b, 1911b, 1911c, 1911h). Although he derived the correct transformation, the invariant limiting speed remained undefined. Ignatowski had to resort to length contraction of moving electrostatic fields in order to identify this limiting velocity with the velocity of light in vacuum. While some said that this approach was insufficient and the second postulate is still needed, others continued the attempts to derive special relativity without the light postulate (see Postulates of special relativity). Ignatowski also investigated the status of rigid bodies within special relativity (1910a, 1911a). He concluded that velocities greater than the speed of light are possible, even though he showed that those are not signal velocities and therefore are not in conflict with relativity (1910b, 1911g). He also formulated a relativistic theory of hydrodynamics (1911f).

Ignatowski is also known for his work in the field of optics, whereby he founded the only optical-mechanical facility in the Soviet Union. He is mentioned in Richard Adolf Zsigmondy's Nobel Lecture as the inventor of the concentric ball condenser for microscopes.

== See also ==
- History of special relativity

== Publications ==
Relativity

- Ignatowsky, W. v. (1910a). "Der starre Körper und das Relativitätsprinzip". Annalen der Physik. 338 (13): 607–630. Bibcode:1910AnP...338..607I. doi:10.1002/andp.19103381309.
- Ignatowsky, W. v. (1910b). "Einige allgemeine Bemerkungen über das Relativitätsprinzip" . Physikalische Zeitschrift. 11: 972–976.

- English Wikisource translation: Some General Remarks on the Relativity Principle

- Ignatowsky, W. v. (1911a). "Bemerkung zu der Arbeit: Der starre Körper und das Relativitätsprinzip". Annalen der Physik. 339 (2): 373–375. Bibcode:1911AnP...339..373I. doi:10.1002/andp.19113390209.
- Ignatowsky, W. v. (1911b). "Das Relativitätsprinzip" . Archiv der Mathematik und Physik. 17: 1–24.
- Ignatowsky, W. v. (1911c). "Das Relativitätsprinzip" . Archiv der Mathematik und Physik. 18: 17–40.
- Ignatowsky, W. v. (1911d). "Zur Elastizitätstheorie vom Standpunkt des Relativitätsprinzips". Physikalische Zeitschrift. 12: 164–169.
- Ignatowsky, W. v. (1911e). "Zum Ehrenfestschen Paradoxon" . Physikalische Zeitschrift. 12: 414.
- Ignatowsky, W. v. (1911f). "Zur Hydrodynamik vom Standpunkte des Relativitätsprinzips". Physikalische Zeitschrift. 12: 441–442.
- Ignatowsky, W. v. (1911g). "Über Überlichtgeschwindigkeiten in der Relativitätstheorie" . Physikalische Zeitschrift. 12: 776–778.
- Ignatowsky, W. v. (1911h). "Eine Bemerkung zu meiner Arbeit: "Einige allgemeine Bemerkungen zum Relativitätsprinzip"" . Physikalische Zeitschrift. 12: 779.

More

- Ignatowsky, W. v. (1905). "Reflexion elektromagnetisches Wellen an einem Draht". Annalen der Physik. 323 (13): 495–522. Bibcode:1905AnP...323..495I. doi:10.1002/andp.19053231305.
- Ignatowsky, W. v. (1905). "Berichtigung zu der Arbeit: Reflexion elektromagnetischer Wellen an einem Draht". Annalen der Physik. 323 (15): 1078. Bibcode:1905AnP...323.1078I. doi:10.1002/andp.19053231517.
- Ignatowsky, W. v. (1907). "Diffraktion und Reflexion, abgeleitet aus den Maxwellschen Gleichungen". Annalen der Physik. 328 (10): 875–904. Bibcode:1907AnP...328..875I. doi:10.1002/andp.19073281005.
- Ignatowsky, W. v. (1907). "Berechnung des Widerstandes eines Drahtes bei der Reflexion von elektromagnetischen Wellen". Annalen der Physik. 328 (10): 905–906. Bibcode:1907AnP...328..905I. doi:10.1002/andp.19073281006.
- Ignatowsky, W. v. (1908). "Diffraktion und Reflexion, abgeleitet aus den Maxwellschen Gleichungen". Annalen der Physik. 330 (1): 99–117. Bibcode:1908AnP...330...99I. doi:10.1002/andp.19083300108.
- Ignatowsky, W. v. (1908). "Diffraktion und Reflexion, abgeleitet aus den Maxwellschen Gleichungen". Annalen der Physik. 331 (10): 1031–1032. Bibcode:1908AnP...331.1031I. doi:10.1002/andp.19083311012.
- Ignatowsky, W. v. (1912). "Über totale Reflexion". Annalen der Physik. 342 (5): 901–910. Bibcode:1912AnP...342..901V. doi:10.1002/andp.19123420504.
- Ignatowsky, W. v. & Oettinger, E. (1912). "Experimentelle Untersuchungen zur Totalreflexion". Annalen der Physik. 342 (5): 911–922. Bibcode:1912AnP...342..911I. doi:10.1002/andp.19123420505.
- Ignatowsky, W. v. (1914). "Zur Theorie der Gitter". Annalen der Physik. 349 (11): 369–436. Bibcode:1914AnP...349..369V. doi:10.1002/andp.19143491103.
- Ignatowsky, W. v. (1925). "Zur Theorie der Beugung an schwarzen Schirmen und Erwiderung an F. Kottler". Annalen der Physik. 319 (14): 589–643. Bibcode:1925AnP...382..589I. doi:10.1002/andp.19253821402.
- Ignatowsky, W. v. (1927). "Zur Theorie der Beugung an schwarzen Schirmen". Annalen der Physik. 388 (15): 977–978. Bibcode:1927AnP...388..977I. doi:10.1002/andp.19273881506.
- Ignatowsky, W. v. (1932). "Über doppelpolige Lösungen der Wellengleichung". Mathematische Zeitschrift. 34: 1–34. doi:10.1007/BF01180574. S2CID 124877763.
