= Hans Robert Müller =

Austrian mathematician (1911–1999)

- Born: October 26, 1911; Graz, Austria
- Died: March 25, 1999 (aged 87); Wolfenbüttel, Germany
- Occupation: mathematician

Hans Robert Müller (26 October 1911 in Graz – 25 March 1999 in Wolfenbüttel) was an Austrian mathematician, professor and director of mathematical institutes at two universities.

== Career ==
From 1930 to 1935 he studied astronomy, descriptive geometry, mathematics, philosophy, physics at the University of Graz and the Graz University of Technology. In 1935 he passed the teaching examination ("Lehramtsprüfung") for mathematics and descriptive geometry. In 1936 he became assistant at the institute of mathematics at the University Graz, obtaining his doctorate in 1937 in mathematics, the habilitation in 1939, and in 1940 he became a docent. In 1941 he was drafted into the Wehrmacht (reaching the rank of Unteroffizier), became a prisoner of war and was released in September 1945. In the same year he continued his work as teaching assistant in Graz. He obtained the title Privatdozent and subsequently the title extraordinary professor in 1950, and was employed as a permanent assistant at the Graz University of Technology. In 1954 he became professor at the Ankara University. From 1956 until 1963 he was professor at Technische Universität Berlin where he was director of the institute of geometry. In 1963 he became professor at the Braunschweig University of Technology serving as the director of the institute of mathematics, also being the head of the department for natural science from 1963 until 1965, and professor emeritus in 1977.

He was mainly concerned with geometrical studies of kinematics, in particular in relation to the Erlangen program and the works of Wilhelm Blaschke. He also authored some textbooks on geometry.

Some of his doctoral students were Reinhold Heinemann, Josef Hoschek, Heinz Linder, Klaus Meyer, Werner Pelzer.

== Publications (selection) ==
- Müller, Hans Robert (1948). "Zyklographische Betrachtung der Kinematik der speziellen Relativitätstheorie". Monatshefte für Mathematik und Physik. 52: 337–353. doi:10.1007/bf01525338.
- Sphärische Kinematik, Berlin: Deutscher Verlag der Wissenschaften, 1962
- Kinematik, Berlin: de Gruyter, 1963
