= Emil Müller (mathematician) =

Austrian mathematician

Emil Adalbert Müller (22 April 1861 – 1 September 1927) was an Austrian mathematician.

== Biography ==
Born in Lanškroun, he studied mathematics and physics at the University of Vienna and Vienna University of Technology. In 1898 he defended his dissertation (Die Geometrie orientierter Kugeln nach Grassmann’schen Methoden) at the University of Königsberg with Wilhelm Franz Meyer. One year later he received his habilitation at the same university. Since 1902 he was professor for descriptive geometry at the Vienna University of Technology and founder of the Vienna school of descriptive geometry. He also served as dean and president (1912–13). In 1903 he founded the Austrian Mathematical Society together with Ludwig Boltzmann and Gustav von Escherich. In 1904 Müller was an Invited Speaker of the ICM in Heidelberg.

He was a member of the Austrian Academy of Sciences and the German Academy of Sciences Leopoldina.
