= Albert Ribaucour =

Albert Ribaucour (28 November 1845 in Lille – 13 September 1893 in Philippeville, Algeria) was a French Civil Engineer and mathematician.

Ribaucour began to study in 1865 at the Ecole Polytechnique and in 1867 at the Ecole des Ponts et Chaussées. In 1870 he started to work as an engineer at the naval base Rochefort, in 1873 in Draguignan, in 1878 in Aix-en-Provence and in 1886 in Algeria.

He is also known for his contributions to mathematics, particularly in differential geometry and minimal surfaces.

== Some Works ==
- 1870: Sur la déformation des surfaces, Comptes Rendus, 70, p. 330
- 1872: Note sur les développées des surfaces, Comptes Rendus, 74, p. 1399
- 1872: Sur la théorie des lignes de courbure, Comptes Rendus, 74, p. 1489
- 1872: Sur la théorie des lignes de courbure, Comptes Rendus, 74, p. 1570
- 1873: Sur les systèmes cycliques, Comptes Rendus, 76, p. 478
- 1873: Sur les faisceaux de cercles, Comptes Rendus, 76, p. 830
- 1880: Étude des Élassoïdes ou Surfaces A Courbure Moyenne Nulle
