= Special conformal transformation =

Special class of linear fractional transformations

A coordinate grid prior to a special conformal transformation

The same grid after a special conformal transformation

In projective geometry, a special conformal transformation is a linear fractional transformation that is not an affine transformation. Thus the generation of a special conformal transformation involves use of multiplicative inversion, which is the generator of linear fractional transformations that is not affine.

In mathematical physics, certain conformal maps known as spherical wave transformations are special conformal transformations.

== Vector presentation ==
A special conformal transformation can be written

$$x'^\mu = \frac{x^\mu-b^\mu x^2}{1-2b\cdot x+b^2x^2} = \frac{x^2}{|x-bx^2|^2}(x^\mu-b^\mu x^2)\,.$$

It is a composition of an inversion (x^{μ} → x^{μ}/x^{2} = y^{μ}), a translation (y^{μ} → y^{μ} − b^{μ} = z^{μ}), and another inversion (z^{μ} → z^{μ}/z^{2} = x′^{μ})

$$\frac{x'^\mu}{x'^2} = \frac{x^\mu}{x^2} - b^\mu \,.$$

Its infinitesimal generator is

$$K_\mu = -i(2x_\mu x^\nu\partial_\nu - x^2\partial_\mu) \,.$$

Special conformal transformations have been used to study the force field of an electric charge in hyperbolic motion.

== Projective presentation ==
The inversion can also be taken to be multiplicative inversion of biquaternions B. The complex algebra B can be extended to P(B) through the projective line over a ring. Homographies on P(B) include translations:

$$U(q:1) \begin{pmatrix}1 & 0 \\ t & 1 \end{pmatrix} = U(q + t: 1).$$

The homography group G(B) includes of translations at infinity with respect to the embedding q → U(q:1);

$$\begin{pmatrix}0 & 1 \\ 1 & 0 \end{pmatrix}\begin{pmatrix}1 & 0 \\ t & 1\end{pmatrix}\begin{pmatrix}0 & 1 \\ 1 & 0 \end{pmatrix} = \begin{pmatrix}1 & t \\ 0 & 1\end{pmatrix}.$$

The matrix describes the action of a special conformal transformation.

== Group property ==
The translations form a subgroup of the linear fractional group acting on a projective line. There are two embeddings into the projective line of homogeneous coordinates: z → [z:1] and z → [1:z]. An addition operation corresponds to a translation in the first embedding. The translations to the second embedding are special conformal transformations, forming translations at infinity. Addition by these transformations reciprocates the terms before addition, then returns the result by another reciprocation. This operation is called the parallel operation. In the case of the complex plane the parallel operator forms an addition operation in an alternative field using infinity but excluding zero. The translations at infinity thus form another subgroup of the homography group on the projective line.

== History ==
The term special conformal transformation ("speziellen konformen Transformationen" in German) was first used in 1962 by Hans Kastrup.

== See also ==
- Conformal symmetry
