= Ebenezer Cunningham =

British mathematician

Ebenezer Cunningham (7 May 1881 – 12 February 1977) was a British mathematician who is remembered for his research and exposition at the dawn of special relativity.

== Biography ==
Cunningham was born in Hackney, London, the son of a cabinet maker. He was educated at Owen's School, Islington, before going up to St John's College, Cambridge, in 1899 and graduating as Senior Wrangler in 1902, winning the Smith's Prize in 1904.

In 1904, as a lecturer at the University of Liverpool, he began work on a new theorem in relativity with fellow lecturer Harry Bateman. They brought the methods of inversive geometry into electromagnetic theory with their transformations (spherical wave transformation):

Each four-dimensional solution [to Maxwell's equations] could then be inverted in a four-dimensional hypersphere of pseudo-radius K in order to produce a new solution. Central to Cunningham's paper was the demonstration that Maxwell's equations retained their form under these transformations.

He worked with Karl Pearson in 1907 at University College London. Cunningham married Ada Collins in 1908.

In August 1911 he returned to St John's College where he made his career. When drafted for the war in 1915 he did alternative service growing food and in an office at the YMCA. He held a university lectureship from 1926 to 1946.

His book The Principle of Relativity (1914) was one of the first treatises in English about special relativity, along with those by Alfred Robb and Ludwik Silberstein. He followed with Relativity and the Electron Theory (1915) and Relativity, Electron Theory and Gravitation (1921). McCrea writes that Cunningham had doubts whether general relativity produced "physical results adequate return for mathematical elaboration."

He was an ardent pacifist, strongly religious, a member of Emmanuel United Reformed Church, Cambridge and chairman of the Congregational Union of England and Wales for 1953–54 (and, for this role, he was a guest at the Coronation of Queen Elizabeth II and participant of her Coronation procession).

== Works ==
Cunningham's books are available from Internet Archive:

- 1914: The Principle of Relativity
- 1915: Relativity and the Electron Theory
- 1921: Relativity, Electron Theory and Gravitation, second edition

== See also ==
- Conformal group of spacetime
