= Harry Bateman =

British-American mathematician

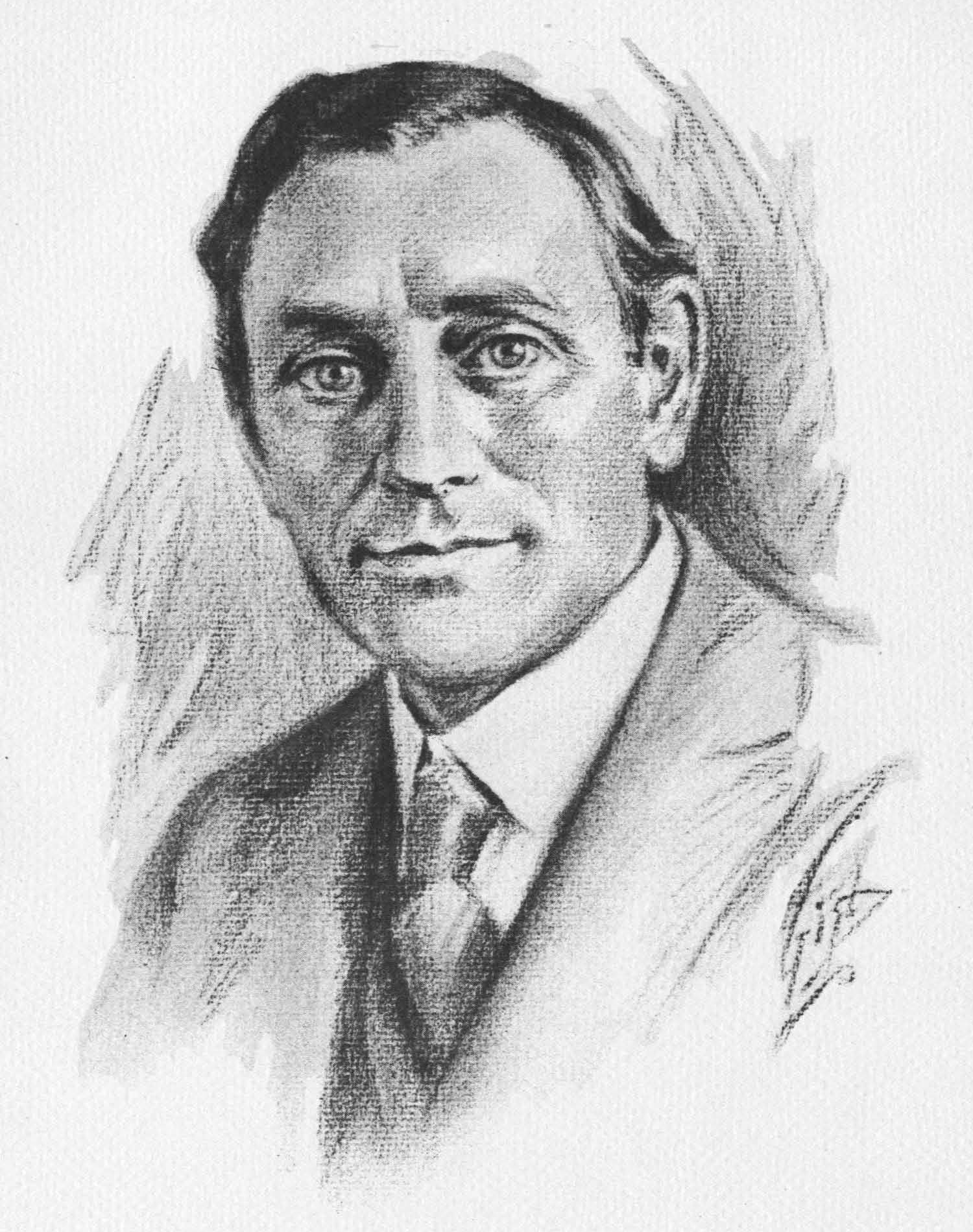
- 1931 drawing of Harry Bateman
- Born: 29 May 1882; Manchester, England
- Died: 21 January 1946 (aged 63); Milford, Utah, USA
- Education: Trinity College, Cambridge (BA, MA); Johns Hopkins University (PhD)
- Known for: Spherical wave transformation Bateman Manuscript Project; Bateman–Burgers equation Bateman equation Bateman function Bateman polynomials Bateman transform
- Awards: Senior Wrangler (1903); Smith's Prize (1905); Gibbs Lecture (1943)
- Scientific career
- Fields: Geometrical optics Partial differential equations Fluid dynamics Electromagnetism
- Workplaces: Bryn Mawr College; Johns Hopkins University; California Institute of Technology
- Thesis: The Quartic Curve and Its Inscribed Configurations (1913)
- Doctoral advisor: Frank Morley
- Doctoral students: Clifford Truesdell; Howard P. Robertson; Albert George Wilson

Harry Bateman FRS (29 May 1882 – 21 January 1946) was an English mathematician with a specialty in differential equations of mathematical physics. With Ebenezer Cunningham, he expanded the views of spacetime symmetry of Lorentz and Poincaré to a more expansive conformal group of spacetime leaving Maxwell's equations invariant. Moving to the US, he obtained a Ph.D. in geometry with Frank Morley and became a professor of mathematics at California Institute of Technology. There he taught fluid dynamics to students going into aerodynamics with Theodore von Karman. Bateman made a broad survey of applied differential equations in his Gibbs Lecture in 1943 titled, "The control of an elastic fluid".

== Biography ==
Bateman was born in Manchester, England, on 29 May 1882. He first gained an interest in mathematics during his time at Manchester Grammar School. In his final year, he won a scholarship to Trinity College, Cambridge. Bateman studied with coach Robert Alfred Herman to prepare for the Cambridge Mathematical Tripos. He distinguished himself in 1903 as Senior Wrangler (tied with P.E. Marrack) and by winning the Smith's Prize (1905).

His first paper, "The determination of curves satisfying given conditions", was published when he was still an undergraduate student. He studied in Göttingen and Paris, and taught at the University of Liverpool and University of Manchester. After moving to the US in 1910, he taught at Bryn Mawr College and then Johns Hopkins University. There, working with Frank Morley in geometry, he achieved his Ph.D., prior to which he had already published more than 60 papers, including some of his celebrated papers. In 1917, he took up his permanent position at the California Institute of Technology, which was then known as the "Throop Polytechnic Institute".

Eric Temple Bell says, "Like his contemporaries and immediate predecessors among Cambridge mathematicians of the first decade of this century [1901–1910]... Bateman was thoroughly trained in both pure analysis and mathematical physics, and retained an equal interest in both throughout his scientific career."

Theodore von Kármán was called in as an advisor for a projected aeronautics laboratory at Caltech and later gave this appraisal of Bateman:

In 1926 Cal Tech [sic] had only a minor interest in aeronautics. The professorship that came nearest to aeronautics was occupied by a shy, meticulous Englishman, Dr. Harry Bateman. He was an applied mathematician from Cambridge who worked in the field of fluid mechanics. He seemed to know everything but did nothing important. I liked him.

Harry Bateman married Ethel Horner in 1912 and had a son named Harry Graham, who died as a child. Later, the couple adopted a daughter named Joan Margaret. He died on his way to New York in 1946 of coronary thrombosis.

== Scientific contributions ==
In 1907, Harry Bateman was lecturing at the University of Liverpool together with another senior wrangler, Ebenezer Cunningham. In 1908, together they came up with the idea of a conformal group of spacetime (now usually denoted as C(1,3)) which involved an extension of the method of images.

Quantity calculation with the Bateman function for 241Pu

In nuclear physics, the Bateman equation is a mathematical model describing abundances and activities in a decay chain as a function of time, based on the decay rates and initial abundances. The model was formulated by Ernest Rutherford in 1905 and the analytical solution was provided by Harry Bateman in 1910.

For his part, in 1910 Bateman published The Transformation of the Electrodynamical Equations. He showed that the Jacobian matrix of a spacetime diffeomorphism which preserves the Maxwell equations is proportional to an orthogonal matrix, hence conformal. The transformation group of such transformations has 15 parameters and extends both the Poincaré group and the Lorentz group. Bateman called the elements of this group spherical wave transformations.

In evaluating this paper, one of his students, Clifford Truesdell, wrote:

The importance of Bateman's paper lies not in its specific details but in its general approach. Bateman, perhaps influenced by Hilbert's point of view in mathematical physics as a whole, was the first to see that the basic ideas of electromagnetism were equivalent to statements regarding integrals of differential forms, statements for which Grassmann's calculus of extension on differentiable manifolds, Poincaré's theories of Stokesian transformations and integral invariants, and Lie's theory of continuous groups could be fruitfully applied.

Bateman was the first to apply Laplace transform to the integral equation in 1906. He submitted a detailed report on integral equations in 1911 to the British association for the advancement of science. Horace Lamb in his 1910 paper solved an integral equation

$$2\int_0^\infty f(y-\zeta^2)\,d\zeta = F(y)$$

as a double integral, but in his footnote he says, "Mr. H. Bateman, to whom I submitted the question, has obtained a simpler solution in the form"

$$f(y) = \frac 1 \pi \int_{-y}^\infty \frac{F'(-z)}{\sqrt{z+x}}dz$$.

In 1914, Bateman published The Mathematical Analysis of Electrical and Optical Wave-motion. As Murnaghan says, this book "is unique and characteristic of the man. Into less than 160 small pages is crowded a wealth of information which would take an expert year to digest." The following year he published a textbook Differential Equations, and sometime later Partial differential equations of mathematical physics. Bateman is also author of Hydrodynamics and Numerical integration of differential equations. Bateman studied the Burgers' equation long before Jan Burgers started to study.

Harry Bateman wrote two significant articles on the history of applied mathematics: "The influence of tidal theory upon the development of mathematics", and "Hamilton's work in dynamics and its influence on modern thought".

In his Mathematical Analysis of Electrical and Optical Wave-motion (p. 131), he describes the charged-corpuscle trajectory as follows:

a corpuscle has a kind of tube or thread attached to it. When the motion of the corpuscle changes a wave or kink runs along the thread; the energy radiated from the corpuscle spreads out in all directions but is concentrated round the thread so that the thread acts as a guiding wire.

This figure of speech is not to be confused with a string in physics, for the universes in string theory have dimensions inflated beyond four, something not found in Bateman's work. Bateman went on to study the luminiferous aether with an article "The structure of the Aether". His starting point is the bivector form of an electromagnetic field, $\mathbf{E} + i \mathbf{B}$. He recalled Alfred-Marie Liénard's electromagnetic fields, and then distinguished another type he calls "aethereal fields":

When a large number of "aethereal fields" are superposed their singular curves indicate the structure of an "aether" which is capable of supporting a certain type of electromagnetic field.

Bateman received many honours for his contributions, including election to the American Philosophical Society in 1924, election to the Royal Society of London in 1928, and election to the National Academy of Sciences in 1930. He was elected as vice-president of the American Mathematical Society in 1935 and was the Society's Gibbs Lecturer for 1943. He was on his way to New York to receive an award from the Institute of Aeronautical Science when he died of coronary thrombosis. The Harry Bateman Research Instructorships at the California Institute of Technology is named in his honour.

After his death, his notes on higher transcendental functions, largely on index cards in shoe boxes found under his bed (according to his colleague Victor Elconin), were edited by Arthur Erdélyi, Wilhelm Magnus, Fritz Oberhettinger, and Francesco G. Tricomi, and published in 1953. The volumes are colloquially known as The Bateman Manuscript.

== Publications ==
In a review of Bateman's book Partial Differential Equations of Mathematical Physics, Richard Courant says that "there is no other work which presents the analytical tools and the results achieved by means of them equally completely and with as many original contributions" and also "advanced students and research workers alike will read it with great benefit".

- 1908: The Conformal Transformations of a Space of Four Dimensions and their Applications to Geometrical Optics, Proceedings of the London Mathematical Society 7: 70–89.
- 1910: History and Present State of the Theory of Integral Equations, Report of the British Association.
- 1914: (dissertation) The Quartic Curve and its Inscribed Configurations, American Journal of Mathematics 36(4).
- 1915: The Mathematical Analysis of Electrical and Optical Wave-motion on the Basis of Maxwell's Equations, Cambridge University Press.
- 1918: Differential equations, Longmans, Green, London, Reprint Chelsea 1966.
- 1932: Partial Differential Equations of Mathematical Physics, Cambridge University Press 1932, Dover 1944, 1959.
- 1933: (with Albert A. Bennett, William E. Milne) Numerical Integration of Differential Equations, Bulletin of the National Research Council, Dover 1956.
- 1932: (with Hugh Dryden, Francis Murnaghan) Report of the Committee on Hydrodynamics, Bulletin of the National Research Council, Washington D.C.
- 1945: The Control of an Elastic Fluid, Bulletin of the American Mathematical Society 51(9):601–646 via Project Euclid, also found in Selected Papers on Mathematical Trends in Control Theory (Richard Bellman & Robert Kalaba editors).
- Bateman Manuscript Project: Higher Transcendental Functions, 3 vols., McGraw Hill 1953/1955, Krieger 1981.
- Bateman Manuscript Project: Tables of Integral Transforms, 2 vols., McGraw Hill 1954.

== See also ==
- Bateman Manuscript Project
