= Projective line =

Line with a point at infinity added

In projective geometry and mathematics more generally, a projective line is, roughly speaking, the extension of a usual line by a point called a point at infinity. The statement and the proof of many theorems of geometry are simplified by the resulting elimination of special cases; for example, two distinct projective lines in a projective plane meet in exactly one point (there is no "parallel" case).

There are many equivalent ways to formally define a projective line; one of the most common is to define a projective line over a field K, commonly denoted P^{1}(K), as the set of one-dimensional subspaces of a two-dimensional K-vector space. This definition is a special instance of the general definition of a projective space.

The projective line over the reals is a manifold; see Real projective line for details.

== Homogeneous coordinates ==
An arbitrary point in the projective line P^{1}(K) may be represented by an equivalence class of homogeneous coordinates, which take the form of a pair

$$[x_1 : x_2]$$

of elements of K that are not both zero. Two such pairs are equivalent if they differ by an overall nonzero factor λ:

$$[x_1 : x_2] \sim [\lambda x_1 : \lambda x_2].$$

== Line extended by a point at infinity ==
The projective line may be identified with the line K extended by a point at infinity. More precisely, the line K may be identified with the subset of P^{1}(K) given by

$$\left\{[x : 1] \in \mathbf P^1(K) \mid x \in K\right\}.$$

This subset covers all points in P^{1}(K) except one, which is called the point at infinity:

$$\infty = [1 : 0].$$

This allows to extend the arithmetic on K to P^{1}(K) by the formulas

$$\frac {1}{0}=\infty,\qquad \frac {1}{\infty}=0,$$
$$x\cdot \infty = \infty \quad \text{if}\quad x\not= 0$$
$$x+ \infty = \infty \quad \text{if}\quad x\not= \infty$$

Translating this arithmetic in terms of homogeneous coordinates gives, when [0 : 0] does not occur:

$$[x_1 : x_2] + [y_1 : y_2] = [(x_1 y_2 + y_1 x_2) : x_2 y_2],$$
$$[x_1 : x_2] \cdot [y_1 : y_2] = [x_1 y_1 : x_2 y_2],$$
$$[x_1 : x_2]^{-1} = [x_2 : x_1].$$

== Examples ==
=== Real projective line ===
The projective line over the real numbers is called the real projective line. It may also be thought of as the line K together with an idealised point at infinity ∞; the point connects to both ends of K creating a closed loop or topological circle.

An example is obtained by projecting points in R^{2} onto the unit circle and then identifying diametrically opposite points. In terms of group theory we can take the quotient by the subgroup {1, −1} under multiplication.

Compare the extended real number line, which distinguishes ∞ and −∞.

=== Complex projective line: the Riemann sphere ===
Adding a point at infinity to the complex plane results in a space that is topologically a sphere. Hence the complex projective line is also known as the Riemann sphere (or sometimes the Gauss sphere). It is in constant use in complex analysis, algebraic geometry and complex manifold theory, as the simplest example of a compact Riemann surface.

=== For a finite field ===
The projective line over a finite field F_{q} of q elements has q + 1 points. In all other respects it is no different from projective lines defined over other types of fields. In the terms of homogeneous coordinates [x : y], q of these points have the form:

[a : 1] for each a in F_{q},

and the remaining point at infinity may be represented as [1 : 0].

== Symmetry group ==
Quite generally, the group of homographies with coefficients in K acts on the projective line P^{1}(K). This group action is transitive, so that P^{1}(K) is a homogeneous space for the group, often written PGL_{2}(K) to emphasise the projective nature of these transformations. Transitivity says that there exists a homography that will transform any point Q to any other point R. The point at infinity on P^{1}(K) is therefore an artifact of choice of coordinates: homogeneous coordinates

$$[X : Y] \sim [\lambda X : \lambda Y]$$

express a one-dimensional subspace by a single non-zero point (X, Y) lying in it, but the symmetries of the projective line can move the point ∞ = [1 : 0] to any other, and it is in no way distinguished.

Much more is true, in that some transformation can take any given distinct points Q_{i} for i = 1, 2, 3 to any other 3-tuple R_{i} of distinct points (triple transitivity). This amount of specification 'uses up' the three dimensions of PGL_{2}(K); in other words, the group action is sharply 3-transitive. The computational aspect of this is the cross-ratio. Indeed, a generalized converse is true: a sharply 3-transitive group action is always (isomorphic to) a generalized form of a PGL_{2}(K) action on a projective line, replacing "field" by "KT-field" (generalizing the inverse to a weaker kind of involution), and "PGL" by a corresponding generalization of projective linear maps.

== As algebraic curve ==
The projective line is a fundamental example of an algebraic curve. From the point of view of algebraic geometry, P^{1}(K) is a non-singular curve of genus 0. If K is algebraically closed, it is the unique such curve over K, up to rational equivalence. In general a (non-singular) curve of genus 0 is rationally equivalent over K to a conic C, which is itself birationally equivalent to projective line if and only if C has a point defined over K; geometrically such a point P can be used as origin to make explicit the birational equivalence.

The function field of the projective line is the field K(T) of rational functions over K, in a single indeterminate T. The field automorphisms of K(T) over K are precisely the group PGL_{2}(K) discussed above.

Any function field K(V) of an algebraic variety V over K, other than a single point, has a subfield isomorphic with K(T). From the point of view of birational geometry, this means that there will be a rational map from V to P^{1}(K), that is not constant. The image will omit only finitely many points of P^{1}(K), and the inverse image of a typical point P will be of dimension dim V − 1. This is the beginning of methods in algebraic geometry that are inductive on dimension. The rational maps play a role analogous to the meromorphic functions of complex analysis, and indeed in the case of compact Riemann surfaces the two concepts coincide.

If V is now taken to be of dimension 1, we get a picture of a typical algebraic curve C presented 'over' P^{1}(K). Assuming C is non-singular (which is no loss of generality starting with K(C)), it can be shown that such a rational map from C to P^{1}(K) will in fact be everywhere defined. (That is not the case if there are singularities, since for example a double point where a curve crosses itself may give an indeterminate result after a rational map.) This gives a picture in which the main geometric feature is ramification.

Many curves, for example hyperelliptic curves, may be presented abstractly, as ramified covers of the projective line. According to the Riemann–Hurwitz formula, the genus then depends only on the type of ramification.

A rational curve is a curve that is birationally equivalent to a projective line (see rational variety); its genus is 0. A rational normal curve in projective space P^{n} is a rational curve that lies in no proper linear subspace; it is known that there is only one example (up to projective equivalence), given parametrically in homogeneous coordinates as

[1 : t : t^{2} : ... : t^{n}].

See Twisted cubic for the first interesting case.

== See also ==
- Algebraic curve
- Cross-ratio
- Möbius transformation
- Projective line over a ring
- Projectively extended real line
- Projective range
- Wheel theory
