= Projective line over a ring =

Projective construction in ring theory

Eight colors illustrate the projective line over Galois field GF(7)

In mathematics, the projective line over a ring is an extension of the concept of projective line over a field. Given a ring A (with 1), the projective line P^{1}(A) over A consists of points identified by projective coordinates. Let A^{×} be the group of units of A; pairs (a, b) and (c, d) from A × A are related when there is a u in A^{×} such that ua = c and ub = d. This relation is an equivalence relation. A typical equivalence class is written U[a, b].

P^{1}(A) = { U[a, b] | aA + bA = A }, that is, U[a, b] is in the projective line if the one-sided ideal generated by a and b is all of A.

The projective line P^{1}(A) is equipped with a group of homographies. The homographies are expressed through use of the matrix ring over A and its group of units V as follows: If c is in Z(A^{×}), the center of A^{×}, then the group action of matrix $\left(\begin{smallmatrix}c & 0 \\ 0 & c \end{smallmatrix}\right)$ on P^{1}(A) is the same as the action of the identity matrix. Such matrices represent a normal subgroup N of V. The homographies of P^{1}(A) correspond to elements of the quotient group V / N.

P^{1}(A) is considered an extension of the ring A since it contains a copy of A due to the embedding E : a → U[a, 1]. The multiplicative inverse mapping u → 1/u, ordinarily restricted to A^{×}, is expressed by a homography on P^{1}(A):

$$U[a,1]\begin{pmatrix}0&1\\1&0\end{pmatrix} = U[1, a] \thicksim U[a^{-1}, 1].$$

Furthermore, for u,v ∈ A^{×}, the mapping a → uav can be extended to a homography:

$$\begin{pmatrix}u & 0 \\0 & 1 \end{pmatrix}\begin{pmatrix}0 & 1 \\ 1 & 0 \end{pmatrix}\begin{pmatrix} v & 0 \\ 0 & 1 \end{pmatrix}\begin{pmatrix} 0 & 1 \\ 1 & 0 \end{pmatrix} = \begin{pmatrix} u & 0 \\ 0 & v \end{pmatrix}.$$
$$U[a,1]\begin{pmatrix}v&0\\0&u\end{pmatrix} = U[av,u] \thicksim U[u^{-1}av,1].$$

Since u is arbitrary, it may be substituted for u^{−1}. Homographies on P^{1}(A) are called linear-fractional transformations since

$$U[z,1] \begin{pmatrix}a&c\\b&d\end{pmatrix} = U[za+b,zc+d] \thicksim  U[(zc+d)^{-1}(za+b),1].$$

== Instances ==
Six colors illustrate the projective line over Galois field GF(5)

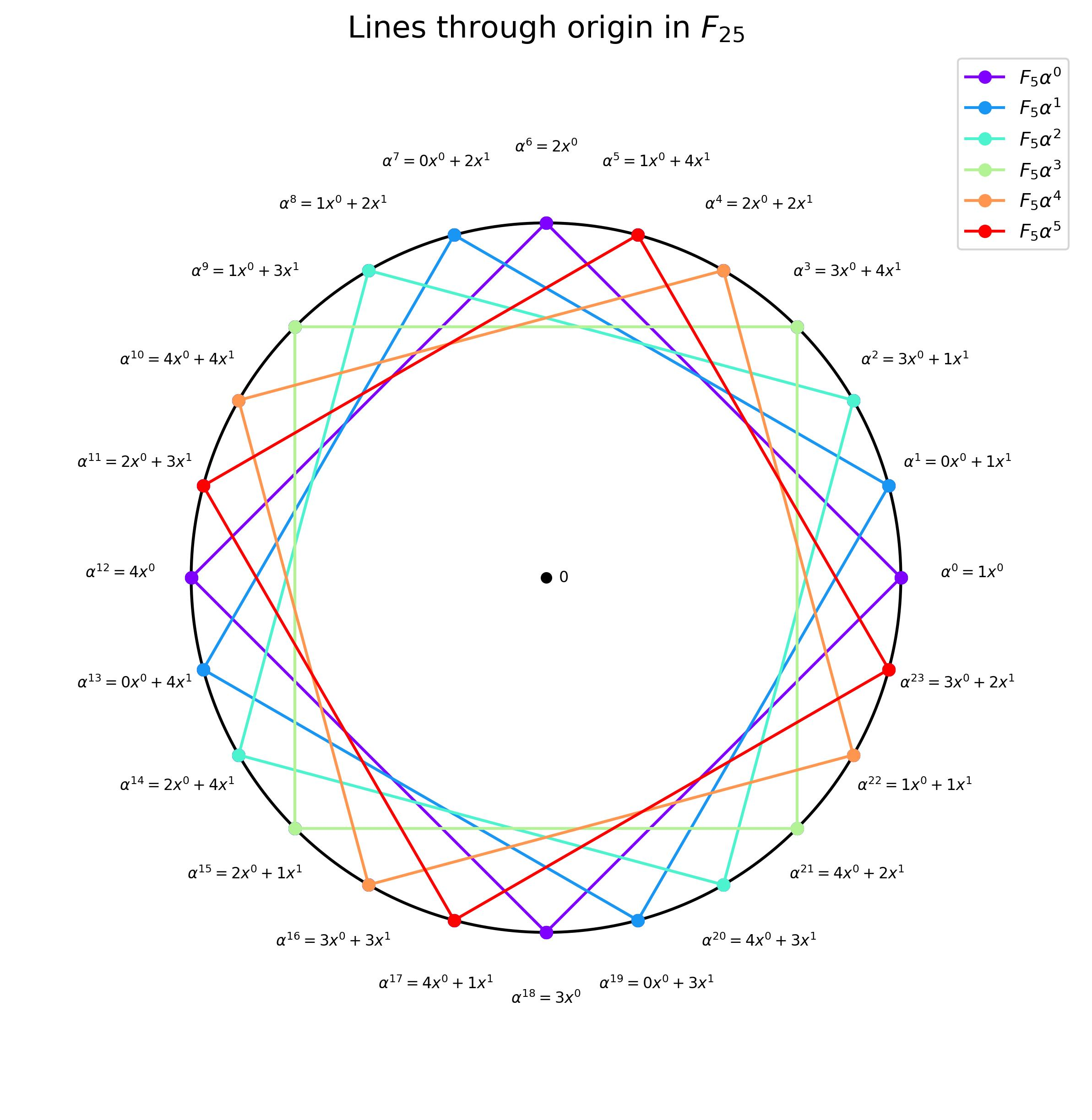
Six lines through the origin in F_25, each corresponding to a point in the projective line P(F_5).

Rings that are fields are most familiar: The projective line over GF(2) has three elements: U[0, 1], U[1, 0], and U[1, 1]. Its homography group is the permutation group on these three.

The ring Z / 3Z, or GF(3), has the elements 1, 0, and −1; its projective line has the four elements U[1, 0], U[1, 1], U[0, 1], U[1, −1] since both 1 and −1 are units. The homography group on this projective line has 12 elements, also described with matrices or as permutations. For a finite field GF(q), the projective line is the Galois geometry PG(1, q). J. W. P. Hirschfeld has described the harmonic tetrads in the projective lines for q = 4, 5, 7, 8, 9.

=== Over discrete rings ===
Consider P^{1}(Z / nZ) when n is a composite number. If p and q are distinct primes dividing n, then ⟨p⟩ and ⟨q⟩ are maximal ideals in Z / nZ and by Bézout's identity there are a and b in Z such that ap + bq = 1, so that U[p, q] is in P^{1}(Z / nZ) but it is not an image of an element under the canonical embedding. The whole of P^{1}(Z / nZ) is filled out by elements U[up, vq], where u ≠ v and u, v ∈ A^{×}, A^{×} being the units of Z / nZ. The instances Z / nZ are given here for n = 6, 10, and 12, where according to modular arithmetic the group of units of the ring is (Z / 6Z)^{×} = {1, 5}, (Z / 10Z)^{×} = {1, 3, 7, 9}, and (Z / 12Z)^{×} = {1, 5, 7, 11} respectively. Modular arithmetic will confirm that, in each table, a given letter represents multiple points. In these tables a point U[m, n] is labeled by m in the row at the table bottom and n in the column at the left of the table. For instance, the point at infinity A = U[v, 0], where v is a unit of the ring.

Tables showing the projective lines over rings Z / nZ for n = 6, 10, 12. Ordered pairs marked with the same letter belong to the same point.

Projective line over the ring Z / 6Z
5	B	G	F	E	D	C
4		J		K		H
3		I	L		L	I
2		H		K		J
1	B	C	D	E	F	G
0		A				A
	0	1	2	3	4	5

Projective line over the ring Z / 10Z
9	B	K	J	I	H	G	F	E	D	C
8		P		O		Q		M		L
7	B	E	H	K	D	G	J	C	F	I
6		O		L		Q		P		M
5		N	R	N	R		R	N	R	N
4		M		P		Q		L		O
3	B	I	F	C	J	G	D	K	H	E
2		L		M		Q		O		P
1	B	C	D	E	F	G	H	I	J	K
0		A		A				A		A
	0	1	2	3	4	5	6	7	8	9

Projective line over the ring Z / 12Z
11	B	M	L	K	J	I	H	G	F	E	D	C
10		T		U		N		T		U		N
9		S	V		W	S		O	W		V	O
8		R		X		P		R		X		P
7	B	I	D	K	F	M	H	C	J	E	L	G
6		Q				Q		Q				Q
5	B	G	L	E	J	C	H	M	F	K	D	I
4		P		X		R		P		X		R
3		O	V		W	O		S	W		V	S
2		N		U		T		N		U		T
1	B	C	D	E	F	G	H	I	J	K	L	M
0		A				A		A				A
	0	1	2	3	4	5	6	7	8	9	10	11

The extra points can be associated with Q ⊂ R ⊂ C, the rationals in the extended complex upper-half plane. The group of homographies on P^{1}(Z / nZ) is called a principal congruence subgroup.

For the rational numbers Q, homogeneity of coordinates means that every element of P^{1}(Q) may be represented by an element of P^{1}(Z). Similarly, a homography of P^{1}(Q) corresponds to an element of the modular group, the automorphisms of P^{1}(Z).

=== Over continuous rings ===
The projective line over a division ring results in a single auxiliary point ∞ = U[1, 0]. Examples include the real projective line, the complex projective line, and the projective line over quaternions. These examples of topological rings have the projective line as their one-point compactifications. The case of the complex number field C has the Möbius group as its homography group.

The projective line over the dual numbers was described by Josef Grünwald in 1906. This ring includes a nonzero nilpotent n satisfying nn = 0. The plane { z = x + yn | x, y ∈ R } of dual numbers has a projective line including a line of points U[1, xn], x ∈ R. Isaak Yaglom has described it as an "inversive Galilean plane" that has the topology of a cylinder when the supplementary line is included. Similarly, if A is a local ring, then P^{1}(A) is formed by adjoining points corresponding to the elements of the maximal ideal of A.

The projective line over the ring M of split-complex numbers introduces auxiliary lines { U[1, x(1 + j)] | x ∈ R } and { U[1, x(1 − j)] | x ∈ R } Using stereographic projection the plane of split-complex numbers is closed up with these lines to a hyperboloid of one sheet. The projective line over M may be called the Minkowski plane when characterized by behaviour of hyperbolas under homographic mapping.

== Modules ==
The projective line P^{1}(A) over a ring A can also be identified as the space of projective modules in the module A ⊕ A. An element of P^{1}(A) is then a direct summand of A ⊕ A. This more abstract approach follows the view of projective geometry as the geometry of subspaces of a vector space, sometimes associated with the lattice theory of Garrett Birkhoff or the book Linear Algebra and Projective Geometry by Reinhold Baer. In the case of the ring of rational integers Z, the module summand definition of P^{1}(Z) narrows attention to the U[m, n], m coprime to n, and sheds the embeddings that are a principal feature of P^{1}(A) when A is topological. The 1981 article by W. Benz, Hans-Joachim Samaga, & Helmut Scheaffer mentions the direct summand definition.

In an article "Projective representations: projective lines over rings" the group of units of a matrix ring M_{2}(R) and the concepts of module and bimodule are used to define a projective line over a ring. The group of units is denoted by GL(2, R), adopting notation from the general linear group, where R is usually taken to be a field.

The projective line is the set of orbits under GL(2, R) of the free cyclic submodule R(1, 0) of R × R. Extending the commutative theory of Benz, the existence of a right or left multiplicative inverse of a ring element is related to P^{1}(R) and GL(2, R). The Dedekind-finite property is characterized. Most significantly, representation of P^{1}(R) in a projective space over a division ring K is accomplished with a (K, R)-bimodule U that is a left K-vector space and a right R-module. The points of P^{1}(R) are subspaces of P^{1}(K, U × U) isomorphic to their complements.

== Cross-ratio ==
A homography h that takes three particular ring elements a, b, c to the projective line points U[0, 1], U[1, 1], U[1, 0] is called the cross-ratio homography. Sometimes the cross-ratio is taken as the value of h on a fourth point x : (x, a, b, c) = h(x).

To build h from a, b, c the generator homographies

$$\begin{pmatrix}0 & 1\\1 & 0 \end{pmatrix}, \begin{pmatrix}1 & 0\\t & 1 \end{pmatrix}, \begin{pmatrix}u & 0\\0 & 1 \end{pmatrix}$$

are used, with attention to fixed points: +1 and −1 are fixed under inversion, U[1, 0] is fixed under translation, and the "rotation" with u leaves U[0, 1] and U[1, 0] fixed. The instructions are to place c first, then bring a to U[0, 1] with translation, and finally to use rotation to move b to U[1, 1].

Lemma: If A is a commutative ring and b − a, c − b, c − a are all units, then (b − c)^{−1} + (c − a)^{−1} is a unit.

Proof: Evidently $\frac{b-a}{(b-c)(c-a)} = \frac{(b-c)+(c-a)}{(b-c)(c-a)}$ is a unit, as required.

Theorem: If (b − c)^{−1} + (c − a)^{−1} is a unit, then there is a homography h in G(A) such that

h(a) = U[0, 1], h(b) = U[1, 1], and h(c) = U[1, 0].

Proof: The point p = (b − c)^{−1} + (c − a)^{−1} is the image of b after a was put to 0 and then inverted to U[1, 0], and the image of c is brought to U[0, 1]. As p is a unit, its inverse used in a rotation will move p to U[1, 1], resulting in a, b, c being all properly placed. The lemma refers to sufficient conditions for the existence of h.

One application of cross ratio defines the projective harmonic conjugate of a triple a, b, c, as the element x satisfying (x, a, b, c) = −1. Such a quadruple is a harmonic tetrad. Harmonic tetrads on the projective line over a finite field GF(q) were used in 1954 to delimit the projective linear groups PGL(2, q) for q = 5, 7, and 9, and demonstrate accidental isomorphisms.

== Chains ==
The real line in the complex plane gets permuted with circles and other real lines under Möbius transformations, which actually permute the canonical embedding of the real projective line in the complex projective line. Suppose A is an algebra over a field F, generalizing the case where F is the real number field and A is the field of complex numbers. The canonical embedding of P^{1}(F) into P^{1}(A) is

$$U_F[x, 1] \mapsto U_A[x, 1] , \quad U_F[1, 0] \mapsto U_A[1, 0].$$

A chain is the image of P^{1}(F) under a homography on P^{1}(A). Four points lie on a chain if and only if their cross-ratio is in F. Karl von Staudt exploited this property in his theory of "real strokes" [reeler Zug].

=== Point-parallelism ===
Two points of P^{1}(A) are parallel if there is no chain connecting them. The convention has been adopted that points are parallel to themselves. This relation is invariant under the action of a homography on the projective line. Given three pair-wise non-parallel points, there is a unique chain that connects the three.

== History ==
August Ferdinand Möbius investigated the Möbius transformations between his book Barycentric Calculus (1827) and his 1855 paper "Theorie der Kreisverwandtschaft in rein geometrischer Darstellung". Karl Wilhelm Feuerbach and Julius Plücker are also credited with originating the use of homogeneous coordinates. Eduard Study in 1898, and Élie Cartan in 1908, wrote articles on hypercomplex numbers for German and French Encyclopedias of Mathematics, respectively, where they use these arithmetics with linear fractional transformations in imitation of those of Möbius. In 1902 Theodore Vahlen contributed a short but well-referenced paper exploring some linear fractional transformations of a Clifford algebra. The ring of dual numbers D gave Josef Grünwald opportunity to exhibit P^{1}(D) in 1906. Corrado Segre (1912) continued the development with that ring.

Arthur Conway, one of the early adopters of relativity via biquaternion transformations, considered the quaternion-multiplicative-inverse transformation in his 1911 relativity study. In 1947 some elements of inversive quaternion geometry were described by P.G. Gormley in Ireland. In 1968 Isaak Yaglom's Complex Numbers in Geometry appeared in English, translated from Russian. There he uses P^{1}(D) to describe line geometry in the Euclidean plane and P^{1}(M) to describe it for Lobachevski's plane. Yaglom's text A Simple Non-Euclidean Geometry appeared in English in 1979. There in pages 174 to 200 he develops Minkowskian geometry and describes P^{1}(M) as the "inversive Minkowski plane". The Russian original of Yaglom's text was published in 1969. Between the two editions, Walter Benz (1973) published his book, which included the homogeneous coordinates taken from M.

== See also ==
- Euclid's orchard

== Notes and references ==
- Brewer, Sky (2012), "Projective Cross-ratio on Hypercomplex Numbers", Advances in Applied Clifford Algebras, doi:10.1007/s00006-12-0335-7 (inactive 12 July 2025)
- Yaglom, I. M. (1968), Complex Numbers in Geometry
