= Projectively extended real line =

Real numbers with an added point at infinity

The projectively extended real line can be visualized as the real number line wrapped around a circle, with its two ends joined at infinity.

In mathematics, the projectively extended real line, $\widehat{\R} = \mathbb{R}\cup\{\infty\}$, is the extension of the real numbers, $\R$, by a single additional point at infinity, denoted $\infty$, with the usual arithmetic operations of addition, subtraction, multiplication, and division extended to support $\infty$ as an operand. Unlike in $\R$, where division by zero is undefined, in $\widehat \R$, by definition, $x/0 = \infty$ and $x/\infty = 0$ for any nonzero number $x$. There is no distinction in $\widehat \R$ between $+\infty$ and $-\infty$: like zero, $\infty$ its own additive inverse. $\widehat \R$ is sometimes instead denoted $\R^*$ or $\bar\R$.

Topologically, $\widehat \R$ is the one-point compactification of the real line; it can be imagined as the result of gluing both infinite ends of the real line together to form a topological circle. The set complement of any finite real interval is a neighborhood of $\infty$. Any sequence of real numbers whose absolute values are increasing and unbounded is taken to converge to $\infty$ as its limit.

The projectively extended real line may be identified with a real projective line in which three points have been assigned the specific values 0, 1 and ∞. The projectively extended real number line is distinct from the affinely extended real number line, in which +∞ and −∞ are distinct.

== Dividing by zero ==
Unlike most mathematical models of numbers, this structure allows division by zero:

$$\frac{a}{0} = \infty$$

for nonzero a. In particular, 1 / 0 = ∞ and 1 / ∞ = 0, making the reciprocal function 1 / x a total function in this structure. The structure, however, is not a field, and none of the binary arithmetic operations are total – for example, 0 ⋅ ∞ is undefined, even though the reciprocal is total. It has usable interpretations, however – for example, in geometry, the slope of a vertical line is ∞.

== Extensions of the real line ==
The projectively extended real line extends the field of real numbers in the same way that the Riemann sphere extends the field of complex numbers, by adding a single point called conventionally ∞.

In contrast, the affinely extended real number line (also called the two-point compactification of the real line) distinguishes between +∞ and −∞.

== Order ==
The order relation cannot be extended to $\widehat{\mathbb{R}}$ in a meaningful way. Given a number a ≠ ∞, there is no convincing argument to define either a > ∞ or that a < ∞. Since ∞ can't be compared with any of the other elements, there's no point in retaining this relation on $\widehat{\mathbb{R}}$. However, order on $\mathbb{R}$ is used in definitions in $\widehat{\mathbb{R}}$.

== Geometry ==
Fundamental to the idea that ∞ is a point no different from any other is the way the real projective line is a homogeneous space, in fact homeomorphic to a circle. For example the general linear group of 2 × 2 real invertible matrices has a transitive action on it. The group action may be expressed by Möbius transformations (also called linear fractional transformations), with the understanding that when the denominator of the linear fractional transformation is 0, the image is ∞.

The detailed analysis of the action shows that for any three distinct points P, Q and R, there is a linear fractional transformation taking P to 0, Q to 1, and R to ∞ that is, the group of linear fractional transformations is triply transitive on the real projective line. This cannot be extended to 4-tuples of points, because the cross-ratio is invariant.

The terminology projective line is appropriate, because the points are in 1-to-1 correspondence with one-dimensional linear subspaces of $\mathbb{R}^2$.

== Arithmetic operations ==
=== Motivation for arithmetic operations ===
The arithmetic operations on this space are an extension of the same operations on reals. A motivation for the new definitions is the limits of functions of real numbers.

=== Arithmetic operations that are defined ===
In addition to the standard operations on the subset $\mathbb{R}$ of $\widehat{\mathbb{R}}$, the following operations are defined for $a \in \widehat{\mathbb{R}}$, with exceptions as indicated:

$$\begin{align}
a + \infty = \infty + a & = \infty, & a \neq \infty \\
a - \infty = \infty - a & = \infty, & a \neq \infty \\
a / \infty = a \cdot 0 = 0 \cdot a & = 0, & a \neq \infty \\
\infty / a & = \infty, & a \neq \infty \\
a / 0 = a \cdot \infty = \infty \cdot a & = \infty, & a \neq 0 \\
0 / a & = 0, & a \neq 0
\end{align}$$

=== Arithmetic operations that are left undefined ===
The following expressions cannot be motivated by considering limits of real functions, and no definition of them allows the statement of the standard algebraic properties to be retained unchanged in form for all defined cases. (Note: An extension does however exist in which all the algebraic properties, when restricted to defined operations in $\widehat{\mathbb{R}}$, resolve to the standard rules: see Wheel theory.) Consequently, they are left undefined:

$$\begin{align}
& \infty + \infty \\
& \infty - \infty \\
& \infty \cdot 0 \\
& 0 \cdot \infty \\
& \infty / \infty \\
& 0 / 0
\end{align}$$

The exponential function $e^x$ cannot be extended to $\widehat{\mathbb{R}}$.

== Algebraic properties ==
The following equalities mean: Either both sides are undefined, or both sides are defined and equal. This is true for any $a, b, c \in \widehat{\mathbb{R}}.$

$$\begin{align}
(a + b) + c & = a + (b + c) \\
a + b & = b + a \\
(a \cdot b) \cdot c & = a \cdot (b \cdot c) \\
a \cdot b & = b \cdot a \\
a \cdot \infty & = \frac{a}{0} \\
\end{align}$$

The following is true whenever expressions involved are defined, for any $a, b, c \in \widehat{\mathbb{R}}.$

$$\begin{align}
a \cdot (b + c) & = a \cdot b + a \cdot c \\
a & = \left(\frac{a}{b}\right) \cdot b & = \,\,& \frac{(a \cdot b)}{b} \\
a & = (a + b) - b & = \,\,& (a - b) + b
\end{align}$$

In general, all laws of arithmetic that are valid for $\mathbb{R}$ are also valid for $\widehat{\mathbb{R}}$ whenever all the occurring expressions are defined.

== Intervals and topology ==
The concept of an interval can be extended to $\widehat{\mathbb{R}}$. However, since it is not an ordered set, the interval has a slightly different meaning. The definitions for closed intervals are as follows (it is assumed that $a, b \in \mathbb{R}, a < b$):

$$\begin{align}
\left[a, b\right] & = \lbrace x \mid x \in \mathbb{R}, a \leq x \leq b \rbrace  \\
\left[a, \infty\right] & = \lbrace x \mid x \in \mathbb{R}, a \leq x \rbrace  \cup \lbrace \infty \rbrace  \\
\left[b, a\right] & = \lbrace x \mid x \in \mathbb{R}, b \leq x \rbrace  \cup \lbrace \infty \rbrace \cup \lbrace x \mid x \in \mathbb{R}, x \leq a \rbrace  \\
\left[\infty, a\right] & = \lbrace \infty \rbrace \cup \lbrace x \mid x \in \mathbb{R}, x \leq a \rbrace  \\
\left[a, a\right] & = \{ a \}  \\
\left[\infty, \infty\right] & = \lbrace \infty \rbrace
\end{align}$$

With the exception of when the end-points are equal, the corresponding open and half-open intervals are defined by removing the respective endpoints. This redefinition is useful in interval arithmetic when dividing by an interval containing 0.

$\widehat{\mathbb{R}}$ and the empty set are also intervals, as is $\widehat{\mathbb{R}}$ excluding any single point. (Note: If consistency of complementation is required, such that $[a,b]^\complement = (b,a)$ and $(a,b]^\complement = (b,a]$ for all $a, b \in \widehat{\mathbb{R}}$ (where the interval on either side is defined), all intervals excluding $\varnothing$ and $\widehat{\mathbb{R}}$ may be naturally represented using this notation, with $(a,a)$ being interpreted as $\widehat{\mathbb{R}}\setminus \{ a \}$, and half-open intervals with equal endpoints, e.g. $(a,a]$, remaining undefined.)

The open intervals as a base define a topology on $\widehat{\mathbb{R}}$. Sufficient for a base are the bounded open intervals in $\mathbb{R}$ and the intervals $(b, a) = \{x \mid x \in \mathbb{R}, b < x\} \cup \{\infty\} \cup \{x \mid x \in \mathbb{R}, x < a\}$ for all $a, b \in \mathbb{R}$ such that $a < b.$

As said, the topology is homeomorphic to a circle. Thus it is metrizable corresponding (for a given homeomorphism) to the ordinary metric on this circle (either measured straight or along the circle). There is no metric which is an extension of the ordinary metric on $\mathbb{R}.$

== Interval arithmetic ==
Interval arithmetic extends to $\widehat{\mathbb{R}}$ from $\mathbb{R}$. The result of an arithmetic operation on intervals is always an interval, except when the intervals with a binary operation contain incompatible values leading to an undefined result. (Note: For example, the ratio of intervals $[0,1]/[0,1]$ contains 0 in both intervals, and since 0 / 0 is undefined, the result of division of these intervals is undefined.) In particular, we have, for every $a, b \in \widehat{\mathbb{R}}$:

$$x \in [a, b] \iff \frac{1}{x} \in \left[ \frac{1}{b}, \frac{1}{a} \right] \!,$$

irrespective of whether either interval includes 0 and ∞.

== Calculus ==
The tools of calculus can be used to analyze functions of $\widehat{\mathbb{R}}$. The definitions are motivated by the topology of this space.

=== Neighbourhoods ===
Let $x \in \widehat{\mathbb{R}}$ and $A \subseteq \widehat{\mathbb{R}}$.

- A is a neighbourhood of x, if A contains an open interval B that contains x.
- A is a right-sided neighbourhood of x, if there is a real number y such that $y \neq x$ and A contains the semi-open interval $[x, y)$.
- A is a left-sided neighbourhood of x, if there is a real number y such that $y \neq x$ and A contains the semi-open interval $(y, x]$.
- A is a punctured neighbourhood (resp. a right-sided or a left-sided punctured neighbourhood) of x, if $x\not\in A,$ and $A\cup\{x\}$ is a neighbourhood (resp. a right-sided or a left-sided neighbourhood) of x.

=== Limits ===
==== Basic definitions of limits ====
Let $f : \widehat{\mathbb{R}} \to \widehat{\mathbb{R}},$ $p \in \widehat{\mathbb{R}},$ and $L \in \widehat{\mathbb{R}}$.

The limit of f (x) as x approaches p is L, denoted

$$\lim_{x \to p}{f(x)} = L$$

if and only if for every neighbourhood A of L, there is a punctured neighbourhood B of p, such that $x \in B$ implies $f(x) \in A$.

The one-sided limit of f (x) as x approaches p from the right (left) is L, denoted

$$\lim_{x \to p^{+}}{f(x)} = L \qquad \left( \lim_{x \to p^{-}}{f(x)} = L \right),$$

if and only if for every neighbourhood A of L, there is a right-sided (left-sided) punctured neighbourhood B of p, such that $x \in B$ implies $f(x) \in A.$

It can be shown that $\lim_{x \to p}{f(x)} = L$ if and only if both $\lim_{x \to p^+}{f(x)} = L$ and $\lim_{x \to p^-}{f(x)} = L$.

==== Comparison with limits in $\mathbb{R}$ ====
The definitions given above can be compared with the usual definitions of limits of real functions. In the following statements, $p, L \in \mathbb{R},$ the first limit is as defined above, and the second limit is in the usual sense:

- $\lim_{x \to p}{f(x)} = L$ is equivalent to $\lim_{x \to p}{f(x)} = L$
- $\lim_{x \to \infty^{+}}{f(x)} = L$ is equivalent to $\lim_{x \to -\infty}{f(x)} = L$
- $\lim_{x \to \infty^{-}}{f(x)} = L$ is equivalent to $\lim_{x \to +\infty}{f(x)} = L$
- $\lim_{x \to p}{f(x)} = \infty$ is equivalent to $\lim_{x \to p}{|f(x)|} = +\infty$
- $\lim_{x \to \infty^{+}}{f(x)} = \infty$ is equivalent to $\lim_{x \to -\infty}{|f(x)|} = +\infty$
- $\lim_{x \to \infty^{-}}{f(x)} = \infty$ is equivalent to $\lim_{x \to +\infty}{|f(x)|} = +\infty$

==== Extended definition of limits ====
Let $A \subseteq \widehat{\mathbb{R}}$. Then p is a limit point of A if and only if every neighbourhood of p includes a point $y \in A$ such that $y \neq p.$

Let $f : \widehat{\mathbb{R}} \to \widehat{\mathbb{R}}, A \subseteq \widehat{\mathbb{R}}, L \in \widehat{\mathbb{R}}, p \in \widehat{\mathbb{R}}$, p a limit point of A. The limit of f (x) as x approaches p through A is L, if and only if for every neighbourhood B of L, there is a punctured neighbourhood C of p, such that $x \in A \cap C$ implies $f(x) \in B.$

This corresponds to the regular topological definition of continuity, applied to the subspace topology on $A\cup \lbrace p \rbrace,$ and the restriction of f to $A \cup \lbrace p \rbrace.$

=== Continuity ===
The function

$$f : \widehat{\mathbb{R}} \to \widehat{\mathbb{R}},\quad p \in \widehat{\mathbb{R}}.$$

is continuous at p if and only if f is defined at p and

$$\lim_{x \to p}{f(x)} = f(p).$$

If $A \subseteq \widehat\mathbb R,$ the function

$$f : A \to \widehat{\mathbb{R}}$$

is continuous in A if and only if, for every $p \in A$, f is defined at p and the limit of $f(x)$ as x tends to p through A is $f(p).$

Every rational function P(x)/Q(x), where P and Q are polynomials, can be prolongated, in a unique way, to a function from $\widehat{\mathbb{R}}$ to $\widehat{\mathbb{R}}$ that is continuous in $\widehat{\mathbb{R}}.$ In particular, this is the case of polynomial functions, which take the value $\infty$ at $\infty,$ if they are not constant.

Also, if the tangent function $\tan$ is extended so that

$$\tan\left(\frac{\pi}{2} + n\pi\right) = \infty\text{ for }n \in \mathbb{Z},$$

then $\tan$ is continuous in $\mathbb{R},$ but cannot be prolongated further to a function that is continuous in $\widehat{\mathbb{R}}.$

Many elementary functions that are continuous in $\mathbb R$ cannot be prolongated to functions that are continuous in $\widehat\mathbb{R}.$ This is the case, for example, of the exponential function and all trigonometric functions. For example, the sine function is continuous in $\mathbb{R},$ but it cannot be made continuous at $\infty.$ As seen above, the tangent function can be prolongated to a function that is continuous in $\mathbb{R},$ but this function cannot be made continuous at $\infty.$

Many discontinuous functions that become continuous when the codomain is extended to $\widehat{\mathbb{R}}$ remain discontinuous if the codomain is extended to the affinely extended real number system $\overline{\mathbb{R}}.$ This is the case of the function $x\mapsto \frac 1x.$ On the other hand, some functions that are continuous in $\mathbb R$ and discontinuous at $\infty \in \widehat{\mathbb{R}}$ become continuous if the domain is extended to $\overline{\mathbb{R}}.$ This is the case for the arctangent.

== As a projective range ==
When the real projective line is considered in the context of the real projective plane, then the consequences of Desargues' theorem are implicit. In particular, the construction of the projective harmonic conjugate relation between points is part of the structure of the real projective line. For instance, given any pair of points, the point at infinity is the projective harmonic conjugate of their midpoint.

As projectivities preserve the harmonic relation, they form the automorphisms of the real projective line. The projectivities are described algebraically as homographies, since the real numbers form a ring, according to the general construction of a projective line over a ring. Collectively they form the group PGL(2, R).

The projectivities which are their own inverses are called involutions. A hyperbolic involution has two fixed points. Two of these correspond to elementary, arithmetic operations on the real projective line: negation and reciprocation. Indeed, 0 and ∞ are fixed under negation, while 1 and −1 are fixed under reciprocation.

== See also ==
- Real projective plane
- Complex projective plane
- Wheel theory
