= Real projective line =

Projective line over the real numbers

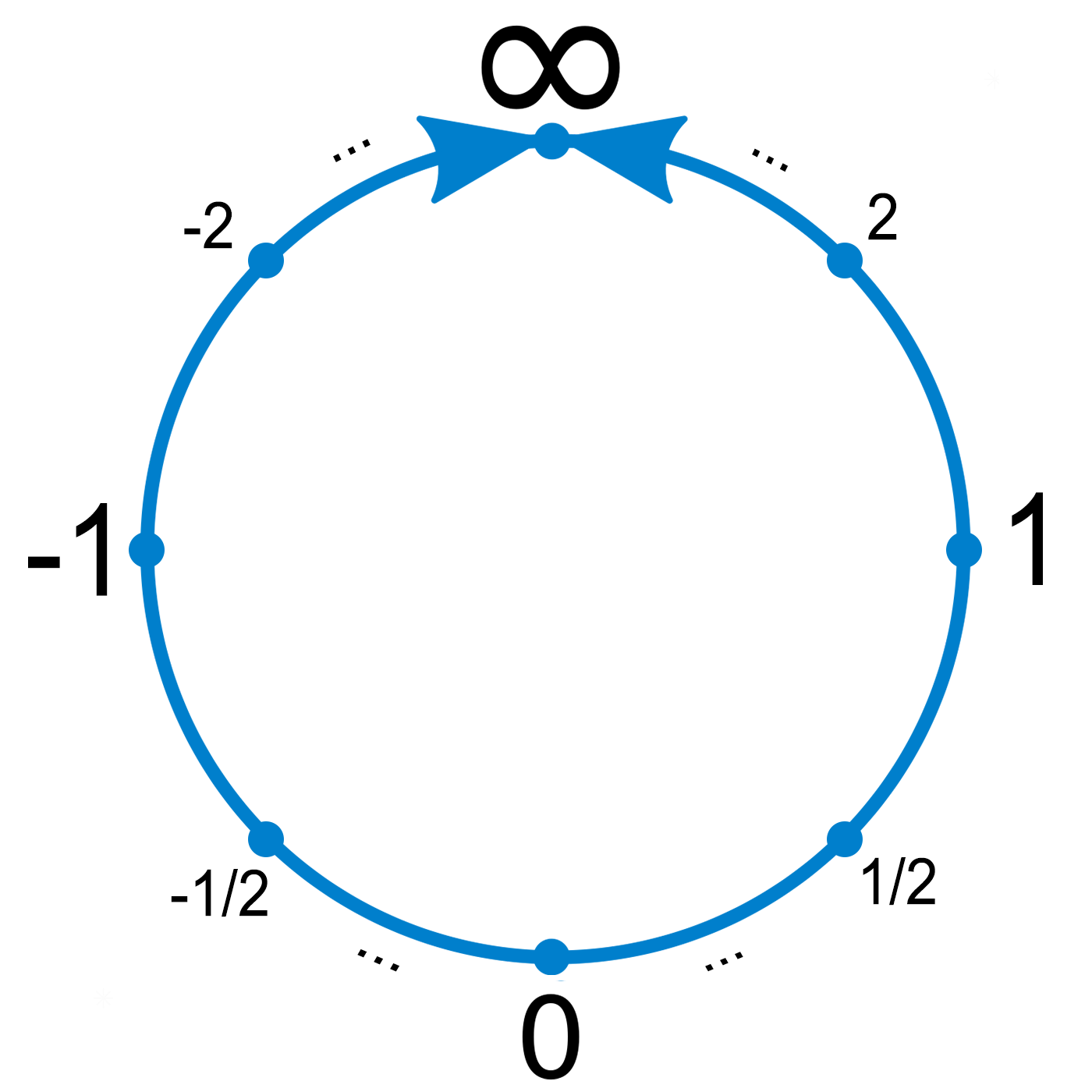
The real projective line can be modeled by the projectively extended real line, which consists of the real line together with a point at infinity; i.e., the one-point compactification of R.

In geometry, a real projective line is a projective line over the real numbers. It is an extension of the usual concept of a line that has been historically introduced to solve a problem set by visual perspective: two parallel lines do not intersect but seem to intersect "at infinity". For solving this problem, points at infinity have been introduced, in such a way that in a real projective plane, two distinct projective lines meet in exactly one point. The set of these points at infinity, the "horizon" of the visual perspective in the plane, is a real projective line. It is the set of directions emanating from an observer situated at any point, with opposite directions identified.

An example of a real projective line is the projectively extended real line, which is often called the projective line.

Formally, a real projective line P(R) is defined as the set of all one-dimensional linear subspaces of a two-dimensional vector space over the reals. The automorphisms of a real projective line are called projective transformations, homographies, or linear fractional transformations. They form the projective linear group PGL(2, R). Each element of PGL(2, R) can be defined by a nonsingular 2×2 real matrix, and two matrices define the same element of PGL(2, R) if one is the product of the other and a nonzero real number.

Topologically, real projective lines are homeomorphic to circles. The complex analog of a real projective line is a complex projective line, also called a Riemann sphere.

== Definition ==
The points of the real projective line are usually defined as equivalence classes of an equivalence relation. The starting point is a real vector space of dimension 2, V. Define on V ∖ 0 the binary relation v ~ w to hold when there exists a nonzero real number t such that v = tw. The definition of a vector space implies almost immediately that this is an equivalence relation. The equivalence classes are the vector lines from which the zero vector has been removed. The real projective line P(V) is the set of all equivalence classes. Each equivalence class is considered as a single point, or, in other words, a point is defined as being an equivalence class.

If one chooses a basis of V, this amounts (by identifying a vector with its coordinate vector) to identify V with the direct product R × R = R^{2}, and the equivalence relation becomes (x, y) ~ (w, z) if there exists a nonzero real number t such that (x, y) = (tw, tz). In this case, the projective line P(R^{2}) is preferably denoted P^{1}(R) or $\mathbb{R}\mathbb{P}^1$. The equivalence class of the pair (x, y) is traditionally denoted [x: y], the colon in the notation recalling that, if y ≠ 0, the ratio x : y is the same for all elements of the equivalence class. If a point P is the equivalence class [x: y] one says that (x, y) is a pair of projective coordinates of P.

As P(V) is defined through an equivalence relation, the canonical projection from V to P(V) defines a topology (the quotient topology) and a differential structure on the projective line. However, the fact that equivalence classes are not finite induces some difficulties for defining the differential structure. These are solved by considering V as a Euclidean vector space. The circle of the unit vectors is, in the case of R^{2}, the set of the vectors whose coordinates satisfy x^{2} + y^{2} = 1. This circle intersects each equivalence classes in exactly two opposite points. Therefore, the projective line may be considered as the quotient space of the circle by the equivalence relation such that v ~ w if and only if either v = w or v = −w.

== Charts ==
The projective line is a manifold. This can be seen by above construction through an equivalence relation, but is easier to understand by providing an atlas consisting of two charts

- Chart #1: $y\ne 0, \quad [x: y] \mapsto \frac {x}{y}$
- Chart #2: $x\ne 0, \quad [x: y] \mapsto \frac {y}{x}$

The equivalence relation provides that all representatives of an equivalence class are sent to the same real number by a chart.

Either of x or y may be zero, but not both, so both charts are needed to cover the projective line. The transition map between these two charts is the multiplicative inverse. As it is a differentiable function, and even an analytic function (outside of zero), the real projective line is both a differentiable manifold and an analytic manifold.

The inverse function of chart #1 is the map

$$x \mapsto [x: 1].$$

It defines an embedding of the real line into the projective line, whose complement of the image is the point [1: 0]. The pair consisting of this embedding and the projective line is called the projectively extended real line. Identifying the real line with its image by this embedding, one sees that the projective line may be considered as the union of the real line and the single point [1: 0], called the point at infinity of the projectively extended real line, and denoted ∞. This embedding allows us to identify the point [x: y] either with the real number x/y if y ≠ 0, or with ∞ in the other case.

The same construction may be done with the other chart. In this case, the point at infinity is [0: 1]. This shows that the notion of point at infinity is not intrinsic to the real projective line, but is relative to the choice of an embedding of the real line into the projective line.

== Structure ==
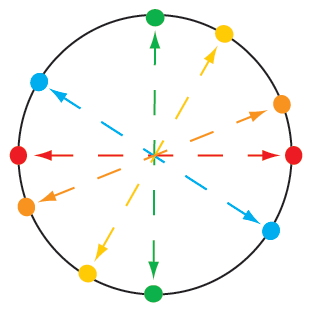
Same color means same point.

Points of the real projective line can be associated with pairs of antipodal points on a circle. Generally, a projective n-space is formed from antipodal pairs on a sphere in (n+1)-space; in this case the sphere is a circle in the plane.

The real projective line is a complete projective range that is found in the real projective plane and in the complex projective line. Its structure is thus inherited from these superstructures. Primary among these structures is the relation of projective harmonic conjugates among the points of the projective range.

The real projective line has a cyclic order that extends the usual order of the real numbers.

== Automorphisms ==
=== The projective linear group and its action ===
Matrix-vector multiplication defines a right action of GL_{2}(R) on the space R^{2} of row vectors: explicitly,

$$(x , y) \begin{pmatrix} a & c \\ b & d \end{pmatrix} = (ax+by : cx+dy) .$$

Since each matrix in GL_{2}(R) fixes the zero vector and maps proportional vectors to proportional vectors, there is an induced action of GL_{2}(R) on P^{1}(R): explicitly,

$$[x:y] \begin{pmatrix} a & c \\ b & d \end{pmatrix} = [ ax+by : cx+dy ].$$

(Here and below, the notation $[x:y]$ for homogeneous coordinates denotes the equivalence class of the row vector.

The elements of GL_{2}(R) that act trivially on P^{1}(R) are the nonzero scalar multiples of the identity matrix; these form a subgroup denoted R^{×}. The projective linear group is defined to be the quotient group PGL_{2}(R) = GL_{2}(R)/R^{×}. By the above, there is an induced faithful action of PGL_{2}(R) on P^{1}(R). For this reason, the group PGL_{2}(R) may also be called the group of linear automorphisms of P^{1}(R).

=== Linear fractional transformations ===
Using the identification R ∪ ∞ → P^{1}(R) sending x to [x:1] and ∞ to [1:0], one obtains a corresponding action of PGL_{2}(R) on R ∪ ∞ , which is by linear fractional transformations: explicitly, since

$$[x:1] \begin{pmatrix} a & c \\ b & d \end{pmatrix} = [ ax+b : cx+d ] \quad \mathrm{and} \quad [1:0] \begin{pmatrix} a & c \\ b & d \end{pmatrix} = [ a : c],$$

the class of
$$\begin{pmatrix} a & c \\ b & d \end{pmatrix}$$
in PGL_{2}(R) acts as $x \mapsto \frac{ax+b}{cx+d}$ with the understanding that each fraction with denominator 0 should be interpreted as ∞. and $\infty \mapsto \frac{a}{c}$.

Some authors use left action on column vectors which entails switching b and c in the matrix operator.

=== Properties ===
- Given two ordered triples of distinct points in P^{1}(R), there exists a unique element of PGL_{2}(R) mapping the first triple to the second; that is, the action is sharply 3-transitive. For example, the linear fractional transformation mapping (0, 1, ∞) to (−1, 0, 1) is the Cayley transform $x\mapsto \frac{x-1}{x+1}$.
- The stabilizer in PGL_{2}(R) of the point ∞ is the affine group of the real line, consisting of the transformations $x \mapsto ax+b$ for all a ∈ R^{*} and b ∈ R.

== See also ==
- Cayley–Klein metric
- Real projective plane
- Complex projective plane
- Wheel theory
