= Wheel theory =

Algebra where division is always defined

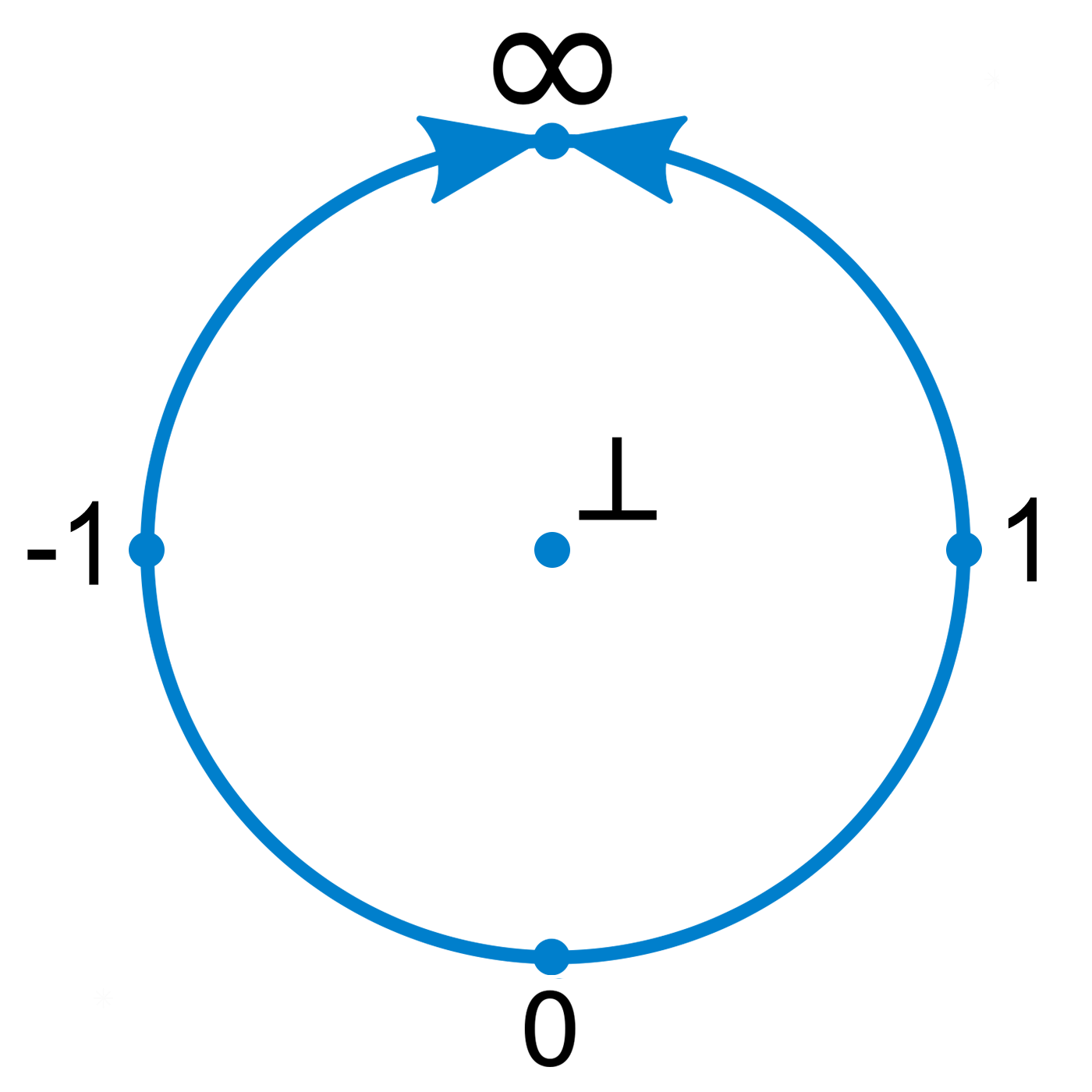
A diagram of a wheel, as the real projective line with a point at nullity (denoted by ⊥)

A wheel is a type of algebra (in the sense of universal algebra) where division is always defined. In particular, division by zero is meaningful. The real numbers can be extended to a wheel, as can any commutative ring.

The term wheel is inspired by the topological picture $\odot$ of the real projective line together with an extra point ⊥ (bottom element) such that $\bot = 0/0$.

A wheel can be regarded as the equivalent of a commutative ring (and semiring) where addition and multiplication are not a group but respectively a commutative monoid and a commutative monoid with involution.

== Definition ==
A wheel is an algebraic structure $(W, 0, 1, +, \cdot, /)$, in which

- $W$ is a set
- ${}0$ and $1$ are elements of that set
- $+$ and $\cdot$ are binary operations
- $/$ is a unary operation

and satisfying the following properties:

- $+$ and $\cdot$ are each commutative and associative, and have $\,0$ and $1$ as their respective identities.
- $/$ is an involution, for example $//x = x$
- $/$ is multiplicative, for example $/(xy) = /x/y$
- $(x + y)z + 0z = xz + yz$
- $(x + yz)/y = x/y + z + 0y$
- $0\cdot 0 = 0$
- $(x+0y)z = xz + 0y$
- $/(x+0y) = /x + 0y$
- $0/0 + x = 0/0$

== Algebra of wheels ==
Wheels replace the usual division as a binary operation with multiplication, with a unary operation applied to one argument $/x$ similar (but not identical) to the multiplicative inverse $x^{-1}$, such that $a/b$ becomes shorthand for $a \cdot /b = /b \cdot a$, but neither $a \cdot b^{-1}$ nor $b^{-1} \cdot a$ in general, and modifies the rules of algebra such that

- $\exists x: 0x \neq 0$
- $\exists x: x/x \neq 1$, as $/x$ is not the same as the multiplicative inverse of $x$.

Other identities that may be derived are

- $0x + 0y = 0xy$
- $x/x = 1 + 0x/x$
- $x-x = 0x^2$

where the negation $-x$ is defined by $-x = ax$ and $x - y = x + (-y)$ if there is an element $a$ such that $1 + a = 0$ (thus in the general case $x - x \neq 0$).

However, for values of $x$ satisfying $0x = 0$ and $0/x = 0$, we get the usual

- $x/x = 1$
- $x-x = 0$

If negation can be defined as above then the subset $\{x\mid 0x=0\}$ is a commutative ring, and every commutative ring is such a subset of a wheel. If $x$ is an invertible element of the commutative ring then $x^{-1} = /x$. Thus, whenever $x^{-1}$ makes sense, it is equal to $/x$, but the latter is always defined, even when $x=0$.

== Examples ==
=== Wheel of fractions ===
Let $A$ be a commutative ring, and let $S$ be a multiplicative submonoid of $A$. Define the congruence relation $\sim_S$ on $A \times A$ via

$(x_1,x_2)\sim_S(y_1,y_2)$ means that there exist $s_x,s_y \in S$ such that $(s_x x_1,s_x x_2) = (s_y y_1,s_y y_2)$.

Define the wheel of fractions of $A$ with respect to $S$ as the quotient $A \times A~/{\sim_S}$ (and denoting the equivalence class containing $(x_1,x_2)$ as $[x_1,x_2]$) with the operations

$0 = [0_A,1_A]$ (additive identity)
$1 = [1_A,1_A]$ (multiplicative identity)
$/[x_1,x_2] = [x_2,x_1]$ (reciprocal operation)
$[x_1,x_2] + [y_1,y_2] = [x_1y_2 + x_2 y_1,x_2 y_2]$ (addition operation)
$[x_1,x_2] \cdot [y_1,y_2] = [x_1 y_1,x_2 y_2]$ (multiplication operation)

In general, this structure is not a ring unless it is trivial, as $0x\ne0$ in the usual sense – here with $x=[0,0]$ we get $0x=[0,0]$, although that implies that $\sim_S$ is an improper relation on our wheel $W$.

This follows from the fact that $[0,0]=[0,1]\implies 0\in S$, which is also not true in general.

=== Projective line and Riemann sphere ===
The special case of the above starting with a field produces a projective line extended to a wheel by adjoining a bottom element noted ⊥, where $0/0=\bot$. The projective line is itself an extension of the original field by an element $\infty$, where $z/0=\infty$ for any element $z\neq 0$ in the field. However, $0/0$ is still undefined on the projective line, but is defined in its extension to a wheel.

Starting with the real numbers, the corresponding projective "line" is geometrically a circle, and then the extra point $0/0$ gives the shape that is the source of the term "wheel". Or starting with the complex numbers instead, the corresponding projective "line" is a sphere (the Riemann sphere), and then the extra point gives a 3-dimensional version of a wheel.

== See also ==
- NaN
