= Projective harmonic conjugate =

Point found separated from another, given a point pair

D is the harmonic conjugate of C with respect to A and B. A, D, B, C form a harmonic range. KLMN is a complete quadrangle generating it.

In projective geometry, the harmonic conjugate point of a point on the real projective line with respect to two other points is defined by the following construction:

Given three collinear points A, B, C, let L be a point not lying on their join and let any line through C meet LA, LB at M, N respectively. If AN and BM meet at K, and LK meets AB at D, then D is called the harmonic conjugate of C with respect to A and B.

The point D does not depend on what point L is taken initially, nor upon what line through C is used to find M and N. This fact follows from Desargues theorem.

In real projective geometry, harmonic conjugacy can also be defined in terms of the cross-ratio as (A, B; C, D) = −1.

== Cross-ratio criterion ==
The four points are sometimes called a harmonic range (on the real projective line) as it is found that D always divides the segment A̅B̅ internally in the same proportion as C divides A̅B̅ externally. That is:

$$\overline{AC}:\overline{BC} = \overline{AD}:\overline{DB} \, .$$

If these segments are now endowed with the ordinary metric interpretation of real numbers they will be signed and form a double proportion known as the cross ratio (sometimes double ratio)

$$(A,B;C,D) = \frac{\overline{AC}}{\overline{AD}} \left/ \frac{\overline{BC}}{-\overline{DB}} \right. ,$$

for which a harmonic range is characterized by a value of −1. We therefore write:

$$(A,B;C,D) = \frac{\overline{AC}}{\overline{AD}} \times \frac{\overline{BD}}{\overline{BC}} = -1 .$$

The value of a cross ratio in general is not unique, as it depends on the order of selection of segments (and there are six such selections possible). But for a harmonic range in particular there are just three values of cross ratio: {−1, 1/2, 2}, since −1 is self-inverse – so exchanging the last two points merely reciprocates each of these values but produces no new value, and is known classically as the harmonic cross-ratio.

In terms of a double ratio, given points a, b on an affine line, the division ratio of a point x is
$$t(x) = \frac {x - a} {x - b} .$$
Note that when a < x < b, then t(x) is negative, and that it is positive outside of the interval. The cross-ratio $(c,d;a,b) = \tfrac{t(c)}{t(d)}$ is a ratio of division ratios, or a double ratio. Setting the double ratio to minus one means that when t(c) + t(d) = 0, then c and d are harmonic conjugates with respect to a and b. So the division ratio criterion is that they be additive inverses.

Harmonic division of a line segment is a special case of Apollonius' definition of the circle.

In some school studies the configuration of a harmonic range is called harmonic division.

== Of midpoint ==
Midpoint and infinity are harmonic conjugates.

When x is the midpoint of the segment from a to b, then
$$t(x) = \frac{x-a}{x-b} = -1.$$
By the cross-ratio criterion, the harmonic conjugate of x will be y when t(y) = 1. But there is no finite solution for y on the line through a and b. Nevertheless,
$$\lim_{y \to \infty} t(y) = 1,$$
thus motivating inclusion of a point at infinity in the projective line. This point at infinity serves as the harmonic conjugate of the midpoint x.

== From complete quadrangle ==
Another approach to the harmonic conjugate is through the concept of a complete quadrangle such as KLMN in the above diagram. Based on four points, the complete quadrangle has pairs of opposite sides and diagonals. In the expression of harmonic conjugates by H. S. M. Coxeter, the diagonals are considered a pair of opposite sides:

D is the harmonic conjugate of C with respect to A and B, which means that there is a quadrangle IJKL such that one pair of opposite sides intersect at A, and a second pair at B, while the third pair meet AB at C and D.

It was Karl von Staudt that first used the harmonic conjugate as the basis for projective geometry independent of metric considerations:

...Staudt succeeded in freeing projective geometry from elementary geometry. In his Geometrie der Lage, Staudt introduced a harmonic quadruple of elements independently of the concept of the cross ratio following a purely projective route, using a complete quadrangle or quadrilateral.

P_{1} = A, P_{2} = S, P_{3} = B, P_{4} = Q, D = M (ignore green M).

To see the complete quadrangle applied to obtaining the midpoint, consider the following passage from J. W. Young:

If two arbitrary lines AQ, AS are drawn through A and lines BS, BQ are drawn through B parallel to AQ, AS respectively, the lines AQ, SB meet, by definition, in a point R at infinity, while AS, QB meet by definition in a point P at infinity. The complete quadrilateral PQRS then has two diagonal points at A and B, while the remaining pair of opposite sides pass through M and the point at infinity on AB. The point M is then by construction the harmonic conjugate of the point at infinity on AB with respect to A and B. On the other hand, that M is the midpoint of the segment A̅B̅ follows from the familiar proposition that the diagonals of a parallelogram (PQRS) bisect each other.

=== Maclaurin and Newton identities ===
Given two points $A$ and $B$, let $M$ be their midpoint; we can without loss of generality give them affixes $-1$, $1$ and $0$ in the complex plane respectively. Then, for any point $C$ with affix $z$, it turns out the harmonic conjugate of $C$ has affix $1/z$. Calling this harmonic conjugate $D$ yields the following identities:

- Maclaurin: $MC \cdot MD = MA^2 = MB^2$ (which in complex numbers simply becomes $z \cdot \frac{1}{z} = 1^2 = (-1)^2$)
- Newton: $DB \cdot DA = DC \cdot DM$ (which in complex numbers states that $(z + 1)(z - 1) = (z - 0)(z - \frac{1}{z})$)

=== Quaternary relations ===
Four ordered points on a projective range are called harmonic points when there is a tetrastigm in the plane such that the first and third are codots and the other two points are on the connectors of the third codot.

If p is a point not on a straight with harmonic points, the joins of p with the points are harmonic straights. Similarly, if the axis of a pencil of planes is skew to a straight with harmonic points, the planes on the points are harmonic planes.

A set of four in such a relation has been called a harmonic quadruple.

== Projective conics ==
A conic in the projective plane is a curve C that has the following property: If P is a point not on C, and if a variable line through P meets C at points A and B, then the variable harmonic conjugate of P with respect to A and B traces out a line. The point P is called the pole of that line of harmonic conjugates, and this line is called the polar line of P with respect to the conic. See the article Pole and polar for more details.

=== Inversive geometry ===
In the case where the conic is a circle, on the extended diameters of the circle, harmonic conjugates with respect to the circle are inverses in a circle. This fact follows from one of Smogorzhevsky's theorems:

If circles k and q are mutually orthogonal, then a straight line passing through the center of k and intersecting q, does so at points symmetrical with respect to k.

That is, if the line is an extended diameter of k, then the intersections with q are harmonic conjugates.

=== Conics and Joachimthal's equation ===
Consider as the curve $C$ an ellipse given by the equation

$$\frac{x^2}{a^2} + \frac{y^2}{b^2} =1.$$

Let $P(x_0,y_0)$ be a point outside the ellipse and $L$ a straight line from $P$ which meets the ellipse at points $A$ and $B$. Let $A$ have coordinates $(\xi,\eta)$. Next take a point $Q(x,y)$ on $L$ and inside the ellipse which is such that $A$ divides the line segment $PQ$ in the ratio $1$ to $\lambda$, i.e.

$$PA=\sqrt{(x_0-\xi)^2+(y_0-\eta)^2}=1, \;\;\; AQ=\sqrt{(x-\xi)^2+(y-\eta)^2}= \lambda$$.

Instead of solving these equations for $\xi$ and $\eta$ it is easier to verify by substitution that the following expressions are the solutions, i.e.

$$(\xi,\eta)=\bigg(\frac{\lambda x+x_0}{\lambda +1}, \frac{\lambda y+y_0}{\lambda +1}\bigg).$$

Since the point $A$ lies on the ellipse $C$, one has

$$\frac{1}{a^2}\bigg(\frac{\lambda x+x_0}{\lambda +1}\bigg)^2 + \frac{1}{b^2}\bigg(\frac{\lambda y+y_0}{\lambda +1}\bigg)^2 = 1,$$

or

$$\lambda^2\bigg(\frac{x^2}{a^2}+\frac{y^2}{b^2}-1\bigg) + 2\lambda\bigg(\frac{xx_0}{a^2}+\frac{yy_0}{b^2}-1\bigg) + \bigg(\frac{x_0^2}{a^2}+\frac{y_0^2}{b^2}-1\bigg)=0.$$

This equation - which is a quadratic in $\lambda$ - is called Joachimthal's equation. Its two roots $\lambda_1,\lambda_2$, determine the positions of $A$ and $B$ in relation to $P$ and $Q$. Let us associate $\lambda_1$ with $A$ and $\lambda_2$ with $B$. Then the various line segments are given by

$$QA=\frac{1}{\lambda_1+1}(x-x_0, y-y_0), \;\; PA=\frac{\lambda_1}{\lambda_1+1}(x_0-x, y_0-y)$$

and

$$QB=\frac{1}{\lambda_2+1}(x-x_0, y-y_0), \;\;  PB=\frac{\lambda_2}{\lambda_2+1}(x_0-x, y_0-y).$$

It follows that

$$\frac{PB}{PA}\frac{QA}{QB}=\frac{\lambda_2}{\lambda_1}.$$

When this expression is $-1$ , we have

$$\frac{QA}{PA}=-\frac{QB}{PB}.$$

Thus $A$ divides $PQ$ ``internally´´ in the same proportion as $B$ divides $PQ$ ``externally´´. The expression

$$\frac{PB}{PA}\frac{QA}{QB}$$

with value $-1$ (which makes it self-inverse) is known as the harmonic cross ratio. With $\lambda_2/\lambda_1=-1$ as above, one has $\lambda_1+\lambda_2=0$ and hence the coefficient of $\lambda$ in Joachimthal's equation vanishes, i.e.

$$\frac{xx_0}{a^2}+\frac{yy_0}{b^2}-1=0.$$

This is the equation of a straight line called the polar (line) of point (pole) $P(x_0,y_0)$. One can show that this polar of $P$ is the chord of contact of the tangents to the ellipse from $P$. If we put $P$ on the ellipse ($\lambda_1=0, \lambda_2=0$) the equation is that of the tangent at $P$. One can also sho that the directrix of the ellipse is the polar of the focus.

== Galois tetrads ==
In Galois geometry over a Galois field GF(q) a line has q + 1 points, where ∞ = (1,0). In this line four points form a harmonic tetrad when two harmonically separate the others. The condition

$$(c, d; a, b) = -1, \ \text{ equivalently } \ \ 2 (c d + a b) = (c + d) (a + b),$$

characterizes harmonic tetrads. Attention to these tetrads led Jean Dieudonné to his delineation of some accidental isomorphisms of the projective linear groups PGL(2, q) for q = 5, 7, 9.

If q = 2^{n}, and given A and B, then the harmonic conjugate of C is itself.

== Iterated projective harmonic conjugates and the golden ratio ==
Let P_{0}, P_{1}, P_{2} be three different points on the real projective line. Consider the infinite sequence of points P_{n}, where P_{n} is the harmonic conjugate of P_{n-3} with respect to P_{n-1}, P_{n-2} for n > 2. This sequence is convergent.

For a finite limit P we have

$$\lim_{n\to\infty}\frac{P_{n+1}P}{P_{n}P}=\Phi-2=-\Phi^{-2} = -\frac{3-\sqrt{5}}{2},$$

where $\Phi=\tfrac{1}{2}(1+\sqrt{5})$ is the golden ratio, i.e. $P_{n+1}P\approx -\Phi^{-2} P_{n}P$ for large n. For an infinite limit we have

$$\lim_{n\to\infty}\frac{P_{n+2}P_{n+1}}{P_{n+1}P_{n}}=-1-\Phi =-\Phi^{2}.$$

For a proof consider the projective isomorphism

$$f(z)=\frac{az+b}{cz+d}$$

with

$$f \left ((-1)^n\Phi^{2n} \right )=P_n.$$

== See also ==
- Section formula
