= One-sided limit =

Limit of a function approaching a value point from values below or above the value point

At $x = 0,$ the function $f(x) = x^2 + \operatorname{sign}(x),$ where $\operatorname{sign}(x)$ denotes the sign function, has a left limit of $-1,$ a right limit of $+1,$ and a function value of $0.$

In calculus, a one-sided limit refers to either one of the two limits of a function $f(x)$ of a real variable $x$ as $x$ approaches a specified point either from the left or from the right.

The limit, as $x$ decreases in value approaching $a$ ($x$ approaches $a$ "from the right" or "from above"), is denoted:

$$\lim_{x \to a^+}f(x) \quad \text{ or } \quad \lim_{x\,\downarrow\,a}\,f(x) \quad \text{ or } \quad \lim_{x \searrow a}\,f(x) \quad \text{ or } \quad f(a+).$$

The limit, as $x$ increases in value approaching $a$ ($x$ approaches $a$ "from the left" or "from below"), is denoted:

$$\lim_{x \to a^-}f(x) \quad \text{ or } \quad \lim_{x\,\uparrow\,a}\, f(x) \quad \text{ or } \quad \lim_{x \nearrow a}\,f(x) \quad \text{ or } \quad f(a-).$$

If the limits from the left and right both exist and are equal, then the limit of $f(x)$ as $x$ approaches $a$ exists. Conversely, if the limit of $f(x)$ as $x$ approaches $a$ exists, then the limits from left and right both exist and are equal. Consequently, the limit as $x$ approaches $a$ is sometimes called a "two-sided limit". It is denoted:
$$\lim_{x \to a} f(x).$$

In some cases in which the two-sided limit does not exist, the two individual one-sided limits nonetheless exist and they are then necessarily unequal.

It is possible for only one of the two one-sided limits to exist. It is also possible for neither of the two one-sided limits to exist.

== Formal definition ==
=== Definition ===
If $I$ represents some interval that is contained in the domain of a function $f$ and if $a$ is a point in $I$, then the right-sided limit as $x$ approaches $a$ can be rigorously defined as the value $R$ that satisfies:

for all $\varepsilon > 0$ there exists some $\delta > 0$ such that for all $x \in I$, if $0 < x - a < \delta$ then $|f(x) - R| < \varepsilon$,

and the left-sided limit as $x$ approaches $a$ can be rigorously defined as the value $L$ that satisfies:

for all $\varepsilon > 0$ there exists some $\delta > 0$ such that for all $x \in I$, if $0 < a - x < \delta$ then $|f(x) - L| < \varepsilon$.

These definitions can be represented more symbolically as follows: Let $I$ represent an interval, where $I \subseteq \mathrm{domain}(f)$ and $a \in I$, then
$$\begin{align}
\lim_{x \to a^{+}} f(x) = R &\iff \forall \varepsilon \in \mathbb{R}_{+}, \exists \delta \in \mathbb{R}_{+}, \forall x \in I, 0 < x - a < \delta   \longrightarrow   | f(x) - R | < \varepsilon, \\
\lim_{x \to a^{-}} f(x) = L &\iff \forall \varepsilon \in \mathbb{R}_{+}, \exists \delta \in \mathbb{R}_{+}, \forall x \in I, 0 < a - x < \delta   \longrightarrow   | f(x) - L | < \varepsilon.
\end{align}$$

=== Intuition ===
In comparison to the formal definition for the limit of a function at a point, the one-sided limit (as the name would suggest) only deals with input values to one side of the approached input value.

For reference, the formal definition for the limit of a function at a point is as follows:

$$\lim_{x \to a} f(x) = L
~~~ \iff ~~~
\forall \varepsilon \in \mathbb{R}_{+}, \exists \delta \in \mathbb{R}_{+}, \forall x \in I,
0 < |x - a| < \delta   \implies   | f(x) - L | < \varepsilon
.$$

To define a one-sided limit, we must modify this inequality. Note that the absolute distance between $x$ and $a$ is

$$|x - a| = |(-1)(-x + a)| = |(-1)(a - x)| = |(-1)||a - x| = |a - x|.$$

For the limit from the right, we want $x$ to be to the right of $a$, which means that $a < x$, so $x - a$ is positive. From above, $x - a$ is the distance between $x$ and $a$. We want to bound this distance by our value of $\delta$, giving the inequality $x - a < \delta$. Putting together the inequalities $0 < x - a$ and $x - a < \delta$ and using the transitivity property of inequalities, we have the compound inequality $0 < x - a < \delta$.

Similarly, for the limit from the left, we want $x$ to be to the left of $a$, which means that $x < a$. In this case, it is $a - x$ that is positive and represents the distance between $x$ and $a$. Again, we want to bound this distance by our value of $\delta$, leading to the compound inequality $0 < a - x < \delta$.

Now, when our value of $x$ is in its desired interval, we expect that the value of $f(x)$ is also within its desired interval. The distance between $f(x)$ and $L$, the limiting value of the left sided limit, is $|f(x) - L|$. Similarly, the distance between $f(x)$ and $R$, the limiting value of the right sided limit, is $|f(x) - R|$. In both cases, we want to bound this distance by $\varepsilon$, so we get the following: $|f(x) - L| < \varepsilon$ for the left sided limit, and $|f(x) - R| < \varepsilon$ for the right sided limit.

== Examples ==
Example 1. The limits from the left and from the right of $g(x) := - \frac{1}{x}$ as $x$ approaches $a := 0$ are, respectively
$$\lim_{x \to 0^-} -\frac{1}{x} = + \infty \qquad \text{ and } \qquad \lim_{x \to 0^+} {-1/x} = - \infty.$$
The reason why $\lim_{x \to 0^-} -\frac{1}{x} = + \infty$ is because $x$ is always negative (since $x \to 0^-$ means that $x \to 0$ with all values of $x$ satisfying $x < 0$), which implies that $- 1/x$ is always positive so that $\lim_{x \to 0^-} -\frac{1}{x}$ diverges (Note: A limit that is equal to $\infty$ is said to diverge to $\infty$ rather than converge to $\infty.$ The same is true when a limit is equal to $- \infty.$) to $+ \infty$ (and not to $- \infty$) as $x$ approaches $0$ from the left. Similarly, $\lim_{x \to 0^+} -\frac{1}{x} = - \infty$ since all values of $x$ satisfy $x > 0$ (said differently, $x$ is always positive) as $x$ approaches $0$ from the right, which implies that $- 1/x$ is always negative so that $\lim_{x \to 0^+} -\frac{1}{x}$ diverges to $- \infty.$

Plot of the function $f(x) = \frac{1}{1 + 2^{-1/x}}$.

Example 2. One example of a function with different one-sided limits is $f(x) = \frac{1}{1 + 2^{-1/x}}$, where the limit from the left is $\lim_{x \to 0^-} f(x) = 0$ and the limit from the right is $\lim_{x \to 0^+} f(x) = 1.$ To calculate these limits, first show that
$$\lim_{x \to 0^-} 2^{-1/x} = \infty \qquad \text{ and } \qquad \lim_{x \to 0^+} 2^{-1/x} = 0,$$
which is true because $\lim_{x \to 0^-} {-1/x} = + \infty$ and $\lim_{x \to 0^+} {-1/x} = - \infty$ so that consequently,
$$\lim_{x \to 0^+} \frac{1}{1 + 2^{-1/x}}
= \frac{1}{1 + \displaystyle\lim_{x \to 0^+} 2^{-1/x}}
= \frac{1}{1 + 0}
= 1$$
whereas $\lim_{x \to 0^-} \frac{1}{1 + 2^{-1/x}} = 0$ because the denominator diverges to infinity; that is, because $\lim_{x \to 0^-} 1 + 2^{-1/x} = \infty$. Since $\lim_{x \to 0^-} f(x) \neq \lim_{x \to 0^+} f(x)$, the limit $\lim_{x \to 0} f(x)$ does not exist.

== Relation to topological definition of limit ==
The one-sided limit to a point $p$ corresponds to the general definition of limit, with the domain of the function restricted to one side, by either allowing that the function domain is a subset of the topological space, or by considering a one-sided subspace, including $p.$ Alternatively, one may consider the domain with a half-open interval topology.

== Abel's theorem ==
A noteworthy theorem treating one-sided limits of certain power series at the boundaries of their intervals of convergence is Abel's theorem.

== See also ==
- Projectively extended real line
- Semi-differentiability
- Limit superior and limit inferior
