= Projective range =

Set of points in a projective line or conic

In mathematics, a projective range is a set of points in projective geometry considered in a unified fashion. A projective range may be a projective line or a conic. A projective range is the dual of a pencil of lines on a given point. For instance, a correlation interchanges the points of a projective range with the lines of a pencil. A projectivity is said to act from one range to another, though the two ranges may coincide as sets.

A projective range expresses projective invariance of the relation of projective harmonic conjugates. Indeed, three points on a projective line determine a fourth by this relation. Application of a projectivity to this quadruple results in four points likewise in the harmonic relation. Such a quadruple of points is termed a harmonic range. In 1940 Julian Coolidge described this structure and identified its originator:

Two fundamental one-dimensional forms such as point ranges, pencils of lines, or of planes are defined as projective, when their members are in one-to-one correspondence, and a harmonic set of one ... corresponds to a harmonic set of the other. ... If two one-dimensional forms are connected by a train of projections and intersections, harmonic elements will correspond to harmonic elements, and they are projective in the sense of Von Staudt.

== Conic ranges ==
When a conic is chosen for a projective range, and a particular point E on the conic is selected as origin, then addition of points may be defined as follows:

Let A and B be in the range (conic) and AB the line connecting them. Let L be the line through E and parallel to AB. The "sum of points A and B", A + B, is the intersection of L with the range.

The circle and hyperbola are instances of a conic and the summation of angles on either can be generated by the method of "sum of points", provided points are associated with angles on the circle and hyperbolic angles on the hyperbola.
