= Limiting point =

Limiting point has the following meanings in mathematics:

- Limit (mathematics)
- Limit point in mathematics
- Limiting point (geometry), one of two points defined from two disjoint circles

== See also ==
- Point at infinity
- Ideal point
- Boundary point
- Boundary marker
