= Circle of antisimilitude =

Disjoint circles.

Intersecting circles.

Congruent circles.

In inversive geometry, the circle of antisimilitude (also known as mid-circle) of two circles, α and β, is a reference circle for which α and β are inverses of each other. If α and β are non-intersecting or tangent, a single circle of antisimilitude exists; if α and β intersect at two points, there are two circles of antisimilitude. When α and β are congruent, the circle of antisimilitude degenerates to a line of symmetry through which α and β are reflections of each other.

== Properties ==
If the two circles α and β cross each other, another two circles γ and δ are each tangent to both α and β, and in addition γ and δ are tangent to each other, then the point of tangency between γ and δ necessarily lies on one of the two circles of antisimilitude. If α and β are disjoint and non-concentric, then the locus of points of tangency of γ and δ again forms two circles, but only one of these is the (unique) circle of antisimilitude. If α and β are tangent or concentric, then the locus of points of tangency degenerates to a single circle, which again is the circle of antisimilitude.

If the two circles α and β cross each other, then their two circles of antisimilitude each pass through both crossing points, and bisect the angles formed by the arcs of α and β as they cross.

If a circle γ crosses circles α and β at equal angles, then γ is crossed orthogonally by one of the circles of antisimilitude of α and β; if γ crosses α and β in supplementary angles, it is crossed orthogonally by the other circle of antisimilitude, and if γ is orthogonal to both α and β then it is also orthogonal to both circles of antisimilitude.

== For three circles ==
Suppose that, for three circles α, β, and γ, there is a circle of antisimilitude for the pair (α,β) that crosses a second circle of antisimilitude for the pair (β,γ). Then there is a third circle of antisimilitude for the third pair (α,γ) such that the three circles of antisimilitude cross each other in two triple intersection points. Altogether, at most eight triple crossing points may be generated in this way, for there are two ways of choosing each of the first two circles and two points where the two chosen circles cross. These eight or fewer triple crossing points are the centers of inversions that take all three circles α, β, and γ to become equal circles. For three circles that are mutually externally tangent, the (unique) circles of antisimilitude for each pair again cross each other at 120° angles in two triple intersection points that are the isodynamic points of the triangle formed by the three points of tangency.

== See also ==
- Inversive geometry
- Limiting point (geometry), the center of an inversion that transforms two circles into concentric position
- Radical axis
