= Ludwig Immanuel Magnus =

German Jewish mathematician (1790–1861)

Ludwig Immanuel Magnus (March 15, 1790 – September 25, 1861) was a German Jewish mathematician who, in 1831, published a paper about the inversion transformation, which leads to inversive geometry.

His reputation as a mathematician was established by 1834 and an honorary doctorate was conferred on him by the University of Bonn. His work appeared in Gergonne's Annales de mathématiques pures et appliquées vols. xi and xvi (1820–25); in Crelle's Journal, vols. v, vii, viii, and ix (1830–32); in the third part (1833) of Meier Hirsch's "Sammlung Geometrischer Aufgaben"; and in "Sammlung von Aufgaben und Lehrsätzen aus der Analytischen Geometrie des Raumes" (published in 1837, written earlier).

He studied Euclid while working in his uncle's bank. From 1813 to 1815 he served as a gunner in the Napoleonic Wars. After the war he returned to banking and taught mathematics until 1834, when the founder of the academy at which he was teaching died. He then left teaching and spent nine years as the head revenue officer for the Berliner Kassenverein, retiring in 1843.
