= Liouville's theorem (conformal mappings) =

Theorem limiting types of conformal mappings in Euclidean space of dimension > 2

In mathematics, Liouville's theorem, proved by Joseph Liouville in 1850, is a rigidity theorem about conformal mappings in Euclidean space. It states that every smooth conformal mapping on a domain of R^{n}, where n > 2, can be expressed as a composition of translations, homotheties, orthogonal transformations and inversions: they are Möbius transformations (in n dimensions). This theorem severely limits the variety of possible conformal mappings in R^{3} and higher-dimensional spaces. By contrast, conformal mappings in R^{2} can be much more complicated – for example, all nonempty proper simply connected planar domains are conformally equivalent, by the Riemann mapping theorem.

Generalizations of the theorem hold for transformations that are only weakly differentiable (Iwaniec & Martin 2001, Chapter 5). The focus of such a study is the non-linear Cauchy–Riemann system that is a necessary and sufficient condition for a smooth mapping f : Ω → R^{n} to be conformal:

$$Df^\mathrm{T} Df = \left|\det Df\right|^{2/n} I$$

where Df is the Jacobian derivative, T is the matrix transpose, and I is the identity matrix. A weak solution of this system is defined to be an element f of the Sobolev space W^{1,n}_{loc}(Ω, R^{n}) with non-negative Jacobian determinant almost everywhere, such that the Cauchy–Riemann system holds at almost every point of Ω. Liouville's theorem is then that every weak solution (in this sense) is a Möbius transformation, meaning that it has the form

$$f(x) = b + \frac{\alpha A (x-a)}{|x-a|^\varepsilon},\qquad
Df = \frac{\alpha A}{|x-a|^\varepsilon}\left(I-\varepsilon\frac{x-a}{|x-a|}\frac{(x-a)^\mathrm{T}}{|x-a|}\right),$$

where a is a vector in R^{n} \ Ω, b is a vector in R^{n}, α is a non-zero scalar, A is a rotation matrix, ε = 0 or 2, and the matrix in parentheses is I or a Householder matrix (so, orthogonal). Equivalently stated, any quasiconformal map of a domain in Euclidean space that is also conformal is a Möbius transformation. This equivalent statement justifies using the Sobolev space W^{1,n}, since f ∈ W^{1,n}_{loc}(Ω, R^{n}) then follows from the geometrical condition of conformality and the ACL characterization of Sobolev space. The result is not optimal however: in even dimensions n = 2k, the theorem also holds for solutions that are only assumed to be in the space W^{1,k}_{loc}, and this result is sharp in the sense that there are weak solutions of the Cauchy–Riemann system in W^{1,p} for any p < k that are not Möbius transformations. In odd dimensions, it is known that W^{1,n} is not optimal, but a sharp result is not known.

Similar rigidity results (in the smooth case) hold on any conformal manifold. The group of conformal isometries of an n-dimensional conformal Riemannian manifold always has dimension that cannot exceed that of the full conformal group SO(n + 1, 1). Equality of the two dimensions holds exactly when the conformal manifold is isometric with the n-sphere or projective space. Local versions of the result also hold: The Lie algebra of conformal Killing fields in an open set has dimension less than or equal to that of the conformal group, with equality holding if and only if the open set is locally conformally flat.
