= Biholomorphism =

Bijective holomorphic function with a holomorphic inverse

The complex exponential function mapping biholomorphically a rectangle to a quarter-annulus.

In the mathematical theory of functions of one or more complex variables, and also in complex algebraic geometry, a biholomorphism or biholomorphic function is a bijective holomorphic function whose inverse is also holomorphic. Note that the last condition is redundant: the inverse of a bijective holomorphic function is always holomorphic.

== Formal definition ==
Formally, a biholomorphic function is a function $\phi$ defined on an open subset U of the $n$-dimensional complex space C^{n} with values in C^{n} which is holomorphic and one-to-one, such that its image is an open set $V$ in C^{n} and the inverse $\phi^{-1}:V\to U$ is also holomorphic. More generally, U and V can be complex manifolds. As in the case of functions of a single complex variable, a sufficient condition for a holomorphic map to be biholomorphic onto its image is that the map is injective, in which case the inverse is also holomorphic.

If there exists a biholomorphism $\phi \colon U \to V$, we say that U and V are biholomorphically equivalent or that they are biholomorphic.

== Riemann mapping theorem and generalizations ==
If $n=1,$ every simply connected open set other than the whole complex plane is biholomorphic to the unit disc (this is the Riemann mapping theorem). The situation is very different in higher dimensions. For example, open unit balls and open unit polydiscs are not biholomorphically equivalent for $n>1.$ In fact, there does not exist even a proper holomorphic function from one to the other.

== Alternative definitions ==
In the case of maps f : U → C defined on an open subset U of the complex plane C, some authors define a conformal map to be an injective map with nonzero derivative i.e., f’(z)≠ 0 for every z in U. According to this definition, a map f : U → C is conformal if and only if f: U → f(U) is biholomorphic. Notice that per definition of biholomorphisms, nothing is assumed about their derivatives, so, this equivalence contains the claim that a homeomorphism that is complex differentiable must actually have nonzero derivative everywhere. Other authors define a conformal map as one with nonzero derivative, but without requiring that the map be injective. According to this weaker definition, a conformal map need not be biholomorphic, even though it is locally biholomorphic, for example, by the inverse function theorem. For example, if f: U → U is defined by f(z) = z^{2} with U = C–{0}, then f is conformal on U, since its derivative f’(z) = 2z ≠ 0, but it is not biholomorphic, since it is 2-1.
