= Limiting point (geometry) =

The two points where the red circles cross are the limiting points of each pair of blue circles

In geometry, the limiting points of two disjoint circles A and B in the Euclidean plane are points p that may be defined by any of the following equivalent properties:

- The pencil of circles defined by A and B contains a degenerate (radius zero) circle centered at p.
- Every circle or line that is perpendicular to both A and B passes through p.
- An inversion centered at p transforms A and B into concentric circles.

The midpoint of the two limiting points is the point where the radical axis of A and B crosses the line through their centers. This intersection point has equal power distance to all the circles in the pencil containing A and B. The limiting points themselves can be found at this distance on either side of the intersection point, on the line through the two circle centers. From this fact it is straightforward to construct the limiting points algebraically or by compass and straightedge. An explicit formula expressing the limiting points as the solution to a quadratic equation in the coordinates of the circle centers and their radii is given by Weisstein.

Inverting one of the two limiting points through A or B produces the other limiting point. An inversion centered at one limiting point maps the other limiting point to the common center of the concentric circles.
