= Section formula =

Geometric formula for finding the ratio in which a line segment is divided by a point

In coordinate geometry, the Section formula is a formula used to find the ratio in which a line segment is divided by a point internally or externally. It is used to find out the centroid, incenter and excenters of a triangle. In physics, it is used to find the center of mass of systems, equilibrium points, etc.

== Internal divisions ==
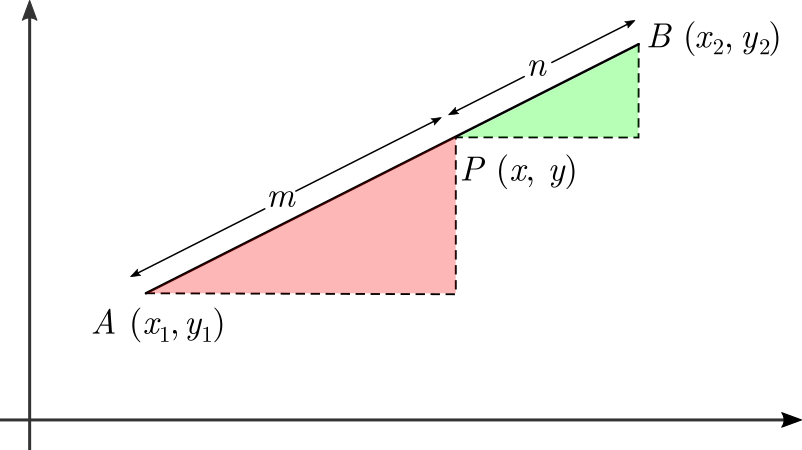
Internal division with section formula

If point P (lying on AB) divides the line segment AB joining the points $\mathrm{A}(x_1,y_1)$ and $\mathrm{B}(x_2,y_2)$ in the ratio m:n, then

$P = \left(\frac{mx_2 + nx_1}{m + n},\frac{my_2 + ny_1}{m + n}\right)$

The ratio m:n can also be written as $m/n:1$, or $k:1$, where $k=m/n$. So, the coordinates of point $P$ dividing the line segment joining the points $\mathrm{A}(x_1,y_1)$ and $\mathrm{B}(x_2,y_2)$ are:

$\left(\frac{mx_2 + nx_1}{m + n}, \frac{my_2 + ny_1}{m + n}\right)$

$=\left(\frac{\frac{m}{n}x_2 +x_1}{\frac{m}{n}+1},\frac{\frac{m}{n}y_2 +y_1}{\frac{m}{n}+1} \right )$

$=\left ( \frac{kx_2 +x_1}{k +1},\frac{ky_2 + y_1}{k +1} \right )$

Similarly, the ratio can also be written as $k:(1-k)$, and the coordinates of P are $((1-k)x_1 + kx_2, (1-k)y_1 + ky_2)$.

=== Proof ===
Triangles $PAQ\sim BPC$.

$$\begin{align}
\frac{AP}{BP}=\frac{AQ}{CP}=\frac{PQ}{BC}\\
\frac{m}{n}=\frac{x-x_1}{x_2-x}=\frac{y-y_1}{y_2-y}\\
mx_2-mx=nx-nx_1,my_2-my=ny-ny_1\\
mx+nx=mx_2+nx_1, my+ny=my_2+ny_1\\
(m+n)x=mx_2+nx_1, (m+n)y=my_2+ny_1\\
x=\frac{mx_2 + nx_1}{m + n}, y=\frac{my_2 + ny_1}{m + n}\\
\end{align}$$

== External divisions ==
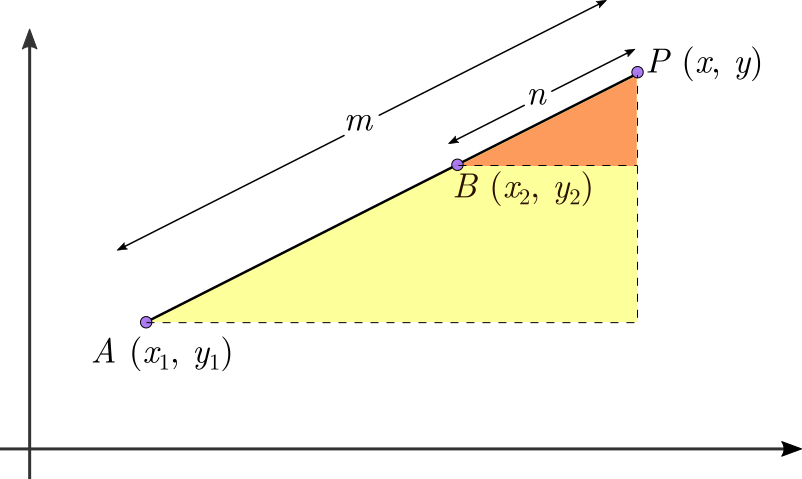
External division with section formula

If a point P (lying on the extension of AB) divides AB in the ratio m:n then

$P = \left(\dfrac{mx_2 - nx_1}{m - n}, \dfrac{my_2 - ny_1}{m - n}\right)$

=== Proof ===
Triangles $PAC\sim PBD$ (Let C and D be two points where A & P and B & P intersect respectively). Therefore ∠ACP = ∠BDP

$$\begin{align}
\frac{AB}{BP}=\frac{AC}{BD}=\frac{PC}{PD}\\
\frac{m}{n}=\frac{x-x_1}{x-x_2}=\frac{y-y_1}{y-y_2}\\
mx-mx_2=nx-nx_1,my-my_2=ny-ny_1\\
mx-nx=mx_2-nx_1, my-ny=my_2-ny_1\\
(m-n)x=mx_2-nx_1, (m-n)y=my_2-ny_1\\
x=\frac{mx_2 - nx_1}{m - n}, y=\frac{my_2 - ny_1}{m - n}\\
\end{align}$$

== Midpoint formula ==
The midpoint of a line segment divides it internally in the ratio $1:1$. Applying the Section formula for internal division:

$$P = \left(\dfrac{x_1 + x_2}{2}, \dfrac{y_1 + y_2}{2} \right)$$

=== Derivation ===
$P = \left(\dfrac{mx_2 + nx_1}{m + n}, \dfrac{my_2 + ny_1}{m + n}\right)$

$= \left ( \frac{1\cdot x_1 + 1\cdot x_2}{1+1},\frac{1 \cdot y_1 + 1\cdot y_2}{1+1} \right )$

$=\left(\dfrac{x_1 + x_2}{2}, \dfrac{y_1 + y_2}{2} \right)$

== Centroid ==
Centroid of a triangle

The centroid of a triangle is the intersection of the medians and divides each median in the ratio $2:1$. Let the vertices of the triangle be $A(x_1, y_1)$, $B(x_2, y_2)$ and $C(x_3, y_3)$. So, a median from point A will intersect BC at $\left(\frac{x_2 + x_3}{2}, \frac{y_2 + y_3}{2}\right)$. Using the section formula, the centroid becomes:

$$\left(\frac{x_1 + x_2 + x_3}{3},\frac{y_1 + y_2 + y_3}{3} \right)$$

== In three dimensions ==
Let A and B be two points with Cartesian coordinates (x_{1}, y_{1}, z_{1}) and (x_{2}, y_{2}, z_{2}) and P be a point on the line through A and B. If $AP:PB =m:n$. Then the section formula gives the coordinates of P as

$\left ( \frac{mx_2 + nx_1}{m +n} ,\frac{my_2 + ny_1}{m+n}, \frac{mz_2 + nz_1}{m+n} \right )$

If, instead, P is a point on the line such that $AP:PB = k:1-k$, its coordinates are $((1-k)x_1 + kx_2, (1-k)y_1 + ky_2, (1-k)z_1 + kz_2)$.

== In vectors ==
The position vector of a point P dividing the line segment joining the points A and B whose position vectors are $\vec{a}$ and $\vec{b}$

1. in the ratio $m:n$ internally, is given by $\frac{n\vec{a} + m\vec{b}}{m+n}$
2. in the ratio $m:n$ externally, is given by $\frac{m\vec{b} - n\vec{a}}{m-n}$

== See also ==
- Cross-section Formula
- Distance Formula
- Midpoint Formula
- Projective harmonic conjugate
