= Unit disk =

Set of points at distance less than one from a given point

An open Euclidean unit disk

In mathematics, the open unit disk (or disc) around P (where P is a given point in the plane), is the set of points whose distance from P is less than 1:
$$D_1(P) = \{ Q : \vert P-Q\vert<1\}.\,$$

The closed unit disk around P is the set of points whose distance from P is less than or equal to one:
$$\bar D_1(P)=\{Q:|P-Q| \leq 1\}.\,$$

Unit disks are special cases of disks and unit balls; as such, they contain the interior of the unit circle and, in the case of the closed unit disk, the unit circle itself.

Without further specifications, the term unit disk is used for the open unit disk about the origin, $D_1(0)$, with respect to the standard Euclidean metric. It is the interior of a circle of radius 1, centered at the origin. This set can be identified with the set of all complex numbers of absolute value less than one. When viewed as a subset of the complex plane (C), the open unit disk is often denoted $\mathbb{D} = \{ z \in \C : |z| < 1 \}$. Unlike the notationally similar circle group $\mathbb{T}$, the (open) unit disk is not a multiplicative group.

== The open unit disk, the plane, and the upper half-plane ==
The function
$$f(z)=\frac{z}{1-|z|^2}$$
is an example of a real analytic and bijective function from the open unit disk to the plane; its inverse function is also analytic. Considered as a real 2-dimensional analytic manifold, the open unit disk is therefore isomorphic to the whole plane. In particular, the open unit disk is homeomorphic to the whole plane.

There is however no conformal bijective map between the open unit disk and the plane. Considered as a Riemann surface, the open unit disk is therefore different from the complex plane.

There are conformal bijective maps between the open unit disk and the open upper half-plane. So considered as a Riemann surface, the open unit disk is isomorphic ("biholomorphic", or "conformally equivalent") to the upper half-plane, and the two are often used interchangeably.

Much more generally, the Riemann mapping theorem states that every simply connected open subset of the complex plane that is different from the complex plane itself admits a conformal and bijective map to the open unit disk.

One bijective conformal map from the open unit disk to the open upper half-plane is the Möbius transformation
$$g(z)=i\frac{1+z}{1-z}$$
which is the inverse of the Cayley transform.

Geometrically, one can imagine the real axis being bent and shrunk so that the upper half-plane becomes the disk's interior and the real axis forms the disk's circumference, save for one point at the top, the "point at infinity". A bijective conformal map from the open unit disk to the open upper half-plane can also be constructed as the composition of two stereographic projections: first the unit disk is stereographically projected upward onto the unit upper half-sphere, taking the "south-pole" of the unit sphere as the projection center, and then this half-sphere is projected sideways onto a vertical half-plane touching the sphere, taking the point on the half-sphere opposite to the touching point as projection center.

The unit disk and the upper half-plane are not interchangeable as domains for Hardy spaces. Contributing to this difference is the fact that the unit circle has finite (one-dimensional) Lebesgue measure while the real line does not.

== Hyperbolic plane ==
The open unit disk forms the set of points for the Poincaré disk model of the hyperbolic plane. Circular arcs perpendicular to the unit circle form the "lines" in this model. The unit circle is the Cayley absolute that determines a metric on the disk through use of cross-ratio in the style of the Cayley–Klein metric. In the language of differential geometry, the circular arcs perpendicular to the unit circle are geodesics that show the shortest distance between points in the model. The model includes motions which are expressed by the special unitary group SU(1,1). The disk model can be transformed to the Poincaré half-plane model by the mapping g given above.

Both the Poincaré disk and the Poincaré half-plane are conformal models of the hyperbolic plane, which is to say that angles between intersecting curves are preserved by motions of their isometry groups.

Another model of hyperbolic space is also built on the open unit disk: the Beltrami–Klein model. It is not conformal, but has the property that the geodesics are straight lines.

== Unit disks with respect to other metrics ==
From top to bottom: open unit disk in the Euclidean metric, taxicab metric, and Chebyshev metric.

One also considers unit disks with respect to other metrics. For instance, with the taxicab metric and the Chebyshev metric disks look like squares (even though the underlying topologies are the same as the Euclidean one).

The area of the Euclidean unit disk is π and its perimeter is 2π. In contrast, the perimeter (relative to the taxicab metric) of the unit disk in the taxicab geometry is 8. In 1932, Stanisław Gołąb proved that in metrics arising from a norm, the perimeter of the unit disk can take any value in between 6 and 8, and that these extremal values are obtained if and only if the unit disk is a regular hexagon or a parallelogram, respectively.

== See also ==
- Unit disk graph
- Unit sphere
- De Branges's theorem
