= Laguerre formula =

Mathematical formula

The Laguerre formula (named after Edmond Laguerre) provides the acute angle $\phi$ between two proper real lines, as follows:

$$\phi=|\frac {1}{2i}\operatorname{Log} \operatorname{Cr}(I_1,I_2,P_1,P_2)|$$

where:

- $\operatorname{Log}$ is the principal value of the complex logarithm
- $\operatorname{Cr}$ is the cross-ratio of four collinear points
- $P_1$ and $P_2$ are the points at infinity of the lines
- $I_1$ and $I_2$ are the intersections of the absolute conic, having equations $x_0=x_1^2+x_2^2+x_3^2=0$, with the line joining $P_1$ and $P_2$.

The expression between vertical bars is a real number.

Laguerre formula can be useful in computer vision, since the absolute conic has an image on the retinal plane which is invariant under camera displacements, and the cross ratio of four collinear points is the same for their images on the retinal plane.

== Derivation ==
It may be assumed that the lines go through the origin. Any isometry leaves the absolute conic invariant, this allows to take as the first line the x axis and the second line lying in the plane z=0. The homogeneous coordinates of the above four points are

$$(0,1,i,0),\ (0,1,-i,0),\ (0,1,0,0),\ (0,\cos\phi,\pm\sin\phi,0),$$

respectively. Their nonhomogeneous coordinates on the infinity line of the plane z=0 are $i$, $-i$, 0, $\pm\sin\phi/\cos\phi$. (Exchanging $I_1$ and $I_2$ changes the cross ratio into its inverse, so the formula for $\phi$ gives the same result.) Now from the formula of the cross ratio we have $\operatorname {Cr}(I_1,I_2,P_1,P_2)=-\frac{-i\cos\phi\pm\sin\phi}{i\cos\phi\pm\sin\phi}=e^{\pm 2i\phi}.$
