= Samuelson's inequality =

Concept in statistics

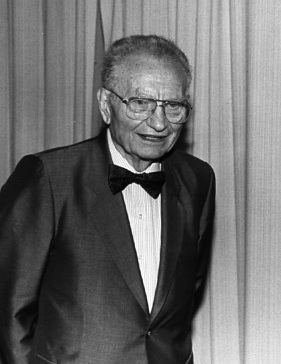

In statistics, Samuelson's inequality, named after the economist Paul Samuelson, also called the Laguerre–Samuelson inequality, after the mathematician Edmond Laguerre, states that every one of any collection x_{1}, ..., x_{n}, is within √n − 1 uncorrected sample standard deviations of their sample mean.

== Statement of the inequality ==
If we let

$$\overline{x} = \frac{x_1+\cdots+x_n}{n}$$

be the sample mean and

$$s = \sqrt{\frac{1}{n} \sum_{i=1}^n (x_i - \overline{x})^2 }$$

be the standard deviation of the sample, then

$\overline{x} - s\sqrt{n-1} \le x_j \le \overline{x} + s\sqrt{n-1}\qquad \text{for } j = 1,\dots,n.$

Equality holds on the left (or right) for $x_j$ if and only if all the n − 1 $x_i$s other than $x_j$ are equal to each other and greater (smaller) than $x_j.$

If you instead define $s = \sqrt{\frac{1}{n-1} \sum_{i=1}^n (x_i - \overline{x})^2 }$ then the inequality $\overline{x} - s\sqrt{n-1} \le x_j \le \overline{x} + s\sqrt{n-1}$ still applies and can be slightly tightened to $\overline{x} - s\tfrac{n-1}{\sqrt{n}} \le x_j \le \overline{x} + s\tfrac{n-1}{\sqrt{n}}.$

== Comparison to Chebyshev's inequality ==
Chebyshev's inequality locates a certain fraction of the data within certain bounds, while Samuelson's inequality locates all the data points within certain bounds.

The bounds given by Chebyshev's inequality are unaffected by the number of data points, while for Samuelson's inequality the bounds loosen as the sample size increases. Thus for large enough data sets, Chebyshev's inequality is more useful.

== Applications ==
Samuelson’s inequality has several applications in statistics and mathematics. It is useful in the studentization of residuals which shows a rationale for why this process should be done externally to better understand the spread of residuals in regression analysis.

In matrix theory, Samuelson’s inequality is used to locate the eigenvalues of certain matrices and tensors.

Furthermore, generalizations of this inequality apply to complex data and random variables in a probability space.

== Relationship to polynomials ==
Samuelson was not the first to describe this relationship: the first was probably Laguerre in 1880 while investigating the roots (zeros) of polynomials.

Consider a polynomial with all roots real:

$$a_0x^n + a_1x^{n-1} + \cdots + a_{n-1}x + a_n = 0$$

Without loss of generality let $a_0 = 1$ and let

$t_1 = \sum x_i$ and $t_2 = \sum x_i^2$

Then

$$a_1 = - \sum x_i = -t_1$$

and

$$a_2 = \sum x_ix_j = \frac{t_1^2 - t_2}{2} \qquad \text{ where } i < j$$

In terms of the coefficients

$$t_2 = a_1^2 - 2a_2$$

Laguerre showed that the roots of this polynomial were bounded by

$$-a_1 / n \pm b \sqrt{n - 1}$$

where

$$b = \frac{\sqrt{nt_2 - t_1^2}}{n} = \frac{\sqrt{na_1^2 - a_1^2 - 2na_2}}{n}$$

Inspection shows that $-\tfrac{a_1}{n}$ is the mean of the roots and that b is the standard deviation of the roots.

Laguerre failed to notice this relationship with the means and standard deviations of the roots, being more interested in the bounds themselves. This relationship permits a rapid estimate of the bounds of the roots and may be of use in their location.

When the coefficients $a_1$ and $a_2$ are both zero no information can be obtained about the location of the roots, because not all roots are real (as can be seen from Descartes' rule of signs) unless the constant term is also zero.
