= Laguerre–Forsyth invariant =

In projective geometry, the Laguerre–Forsyth invariant is a cubic differential that is an invariant of a projective plane curve. It is named for Edmond Laguerre and Andrew Forsyth, the latter of whom analyzed the invariant in an influential book on ordinary differential equations.

Suppose that $p:\mathbf P^1\to\mathbf P^2$ is a three-times continuously differentiable immersion of the projective line into the projective plane, with homogeneous coordinates given by $p(t)=(x_1(t),x_2(t),x_3(t))$ then associated to p is the third-order ordinary differential equation

$$\left|\begin{matrix}
x&x'&x''&x'''\\
x_1&x_1'&x_1''&x_1'''\\
x_2&x_2'&x_2''&x_2'''\\
x_3&x_3'&x_3''&x_3'''\\
\end{matrix}\right| = 0.$$

Generically, this equation can be put into the form

$$x'''+Ax''+Bx'+Cx = 0$$

where $A,B,C$ are rational functions of the components of p and its derivatives. After a change of variables of the form $t\to f(t), x\to g(t)^{-1}x$, this equation can be further reduced to an equation without first or second derivative terms

$$x''' + Rx = 0.$$

The invariant $P=(f')^2R$ is the Laguerre–Forsyth invariant.

A key property of P is that the cubic differential P(dt)^{3} is invariant under the automorphism group $PGL(2,\mathbf R)$ of the projective line. More precisely, it is invariant under $t\to\frac{at+b}{ct+d}$, $dt\to\frac{ad-bc}{(ct+d)^2}dt$, and $x\to C(ct+d)^{-2}x$.

The invariant P vanishes identically if (and only if) the curve is a conic section. Points where P vanishes are called the sextactic points of the curve. It is a theorem of Herglotz and Radon that every closed strictly convex curve has at least six sextactic points. This result has been extended to a variety of optimal minima for simple closed (but not necessarily convex) curves by Thorbergsson & Umehara (2002), depending on the curve's homotopy class in the projective plane.
