= Andrew Forsyth =

19th and 20th-century British mathematician

Andrew Russell Forsyth
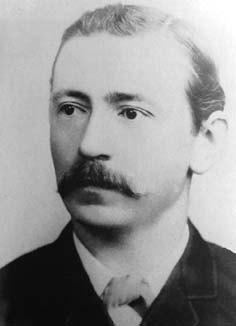
- Andrew Forsyth (1890)
- Born: 18 June 1858; Glasgow, Scotland, United Kingdom of Great Britain and Ireland
- Died: 2 June 1942 (aged 83); South Kensington, England, United Kingdom
- Education: Trinity College, Cambridge
- Awards: Royal Medal (1897)
- Scientific career
- Fields: Mathematics
- Workplaces: University of Liverpool; Trinity College, Cambridge; Imperial College London
- Academic advisors: Arthur Cayley
- Notable students: Edmund Taylor Whittaker

Andrew Russell Forsyth, FRS, FRSE (18 June 1858, Glasgow – 2 June 1942, South Kensington) was a British mathematician.

== Life ==
Forsyth was born in Glasgow on 18 June 1858, the son of John Forsyth, a marine engineer, and his wife Christina Glen.

Forsyth studied at Liverpool College and was tutored by Richard Pendlebury before entering Trinity College, Cambridge, graduating senior wrangler in 1881. He was elected a fellow of Trinity and then appointed to the chair of mathematics at the University of Liverpool at the age of 24. He returned to Cambridge as a lecturer in 1884 and became Sadleirian Professor of Pure Mathematics in 1895. He was elected President of the Mathematical Association for 1903.

Forsyth was forced to resign his chair in 1910 as a result of a scandal caused by his affair with Marion Amelia Boys, née Pollock, the wife of physicist C. V. Boys. Boys was granted a divorce on the grounds of Marion's adultery with Forsyth. Marion and Andrew Forsyth were later married.

Forsyth became professor at the Imperial College of Science in 1913 and retired in 1923, remaining mathematically active into his seventies. He was elected a Fellow of the Royal Society in 1886 and won its Royal Medal in 1897. A.R. Forsyth was elected to Honorary membership of the Manchester Literary and Philosophical Society in 1900. He was a Plenary Speaker of the ICM in 1908 at Rome.

He is now remembered much more as an author of treatises than as an original researcher. His books have, however, often been criticized (for example by J. E. Littlewood, in his A Mathematician's Miscellany). E. T. Whittaker was his only official student.

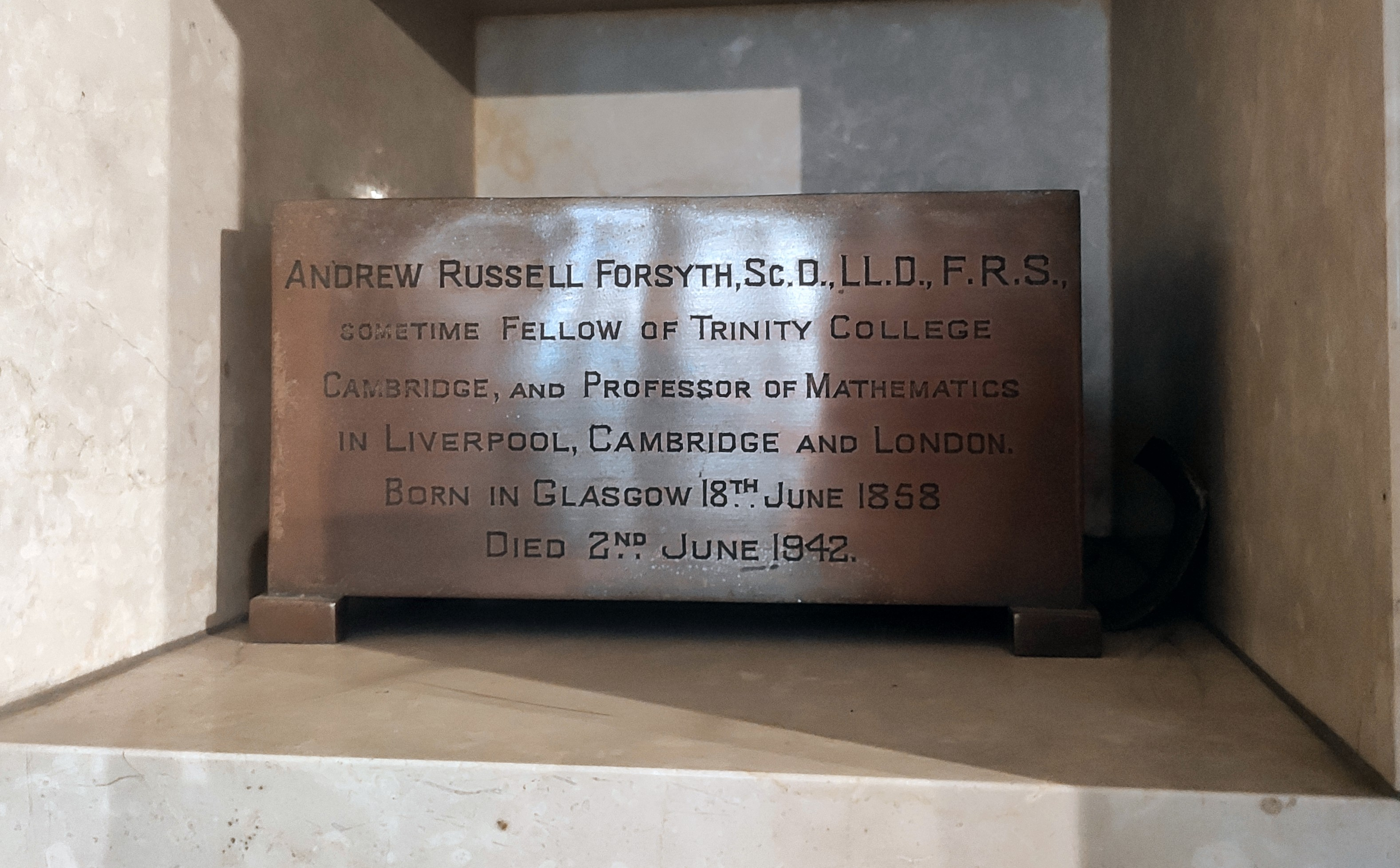
Forsyth's urn at Golders Green Crematorium

He died in London on 2 June 1942 and was cremated at Golders Green Crematorium.

Forsyth received the degree of Doctor mathematicae (honoris causa) from the Royal Frederick University on 6 September 1902, when they celebrated the centennial of the birth of mathematician Niels Henrik Abel.

== Family ==
Forsyth married Marion Amelia Pollock in 1910.

== Works ==
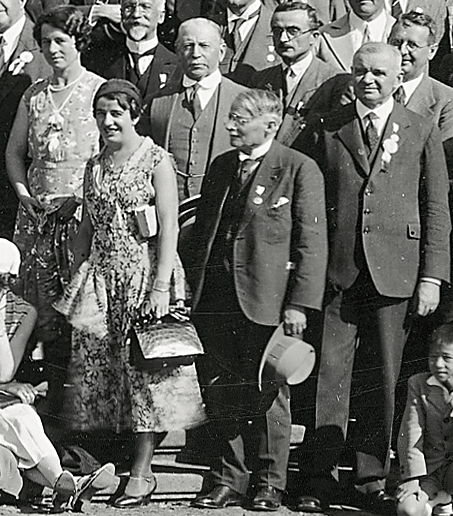
L to R: Dorothy Maud Wrinch, unknown woman in foreground), Élie Cartan (background, head truncated), Andrew Forsyth, Charles Jean de la Vallée Poussin (foreground, holding hat), Eugenio Giuseppe Togliatti (background),Rudolf Fueter, Hermann Weyl; background, partly obscured), at the 1932 International Congress of Mathematicians in Zürich

- A Treatise on Differential Equations (1885)
  - translated into German as Lehrbuch der Differentialgleichungen (1912)
- Theory of Functions of a Complex Variable (1893)
- Geodesics on an oblate spheroid(1895–96)
- Theory of Differential Equations (1890–1906) six volumes
- Lectures on the Differential Geometry of Curves and Surfaces (1912)
- Lectures Introductory to the Theory of Functions of Two Complex Variables(1914)
- Solutions of the Examples in a Treatise on Differential Equations (1918)
- Calculus of Variations (1927)
- Geometry of Four Dimensions (1930)
- Intrinsic Geometry of Ideal Space (1935) vol. 1 vol. 2

== See also ==
- Laguerre–Forsyth invariant
