= Laguerre form =

In mathematics, the Laguerre form is a tensor-valued form on an embedded surface, whose ratio with the infinitesimal line element cubed is invariant with respect to a choice of frame.

== Definition ==
This definition comes from Cartan, translated into more modern notation.

Consider some surface $\Sigma\hookrightarrow M$ embedded in a three dimensional Riemannian manifold $M$. On $\Sigma$, define an orthonormal coframe $e^a$, and let $a$ be the second fundamental form, and the exterior covariant derivative $D$. The Laguerre form is a tensor-valued form defined by
$$\chi = (e^1)^2 D a_{11} + 2 e^1 e^2 D a_{12} + (e^2)^2 D a_{22}$$
or using Einstein summation notation,
$$\chi = e^a \otimes e^b \otimes D a_{ab}$$
