= Edmond Laguerre =

French mathematician (1834–1886)

Edmond Nicolas Laguerre
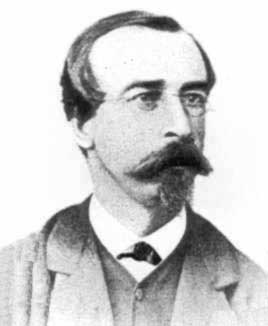
- Born: 9 April 1834; Bar-le-Duc, France
- Died: 14 August 1886 (aged 52); Bar-le-Duc, France
- Known for: Laguerre polynomials, Laguerre's method, Laguerre plane
- Scientific career
- Fields: Mathematics

Edmond Nicolas Laguerre (9 April 1834, Bar-le-Duc – 14 August 1886, Bar-le-Duc) was a French mathematician and a member of the Académie des sciences (1885). His main works were in the areas of geometry and complex analysis. He also investigated orthogonal polynomials (see Laguerre polynomials). He introduced the notion of genus of an entire function. Laguerre's method is a root-finding algorithm tailored to polynomials. He laid the foundations of a geometry of oriented spheres (Laguerre geometry and Laguerre plane), including the Laguerre transformation or transformation by reciprocal directions.

== Works ==
=== Selection ===
- Notes sur la résolution des équations numériques. Paris: Gauthier-Villars. 1880.
- Laguerre, Edmond (1881). "Sur la transformation par directions réciproques" . Comptes rendus. 92: 71–73.
- Laguerre, Edmond (1882). "Transformations par semi-droites réciproques" . Nouvelles annales de mathématiques. 1: 542–556.
- Théorie des équations numériques, Paris: Gauthier-Villars. 1884 on Google Books
- Recherches sur la géométrie de direction; méthodes de transformation; anticaustiques. Gauthier-Villars. 1885.
- (in French) Oeuvres de Laguerre publ. sous les auspices de l'Académie des sciences par MM. Charles Hermite, Henri Poincaré, et Eugène Rouché. (Paris, 1898-1905) (reprint: New York : Chelsea publ., 1972 ISBN 0-8284-0263-9)

=== Extensive lists ===
- More than 80 articles on Nundam.org.p

== See also ==
- Isotropic line
- q-Laguerre polynomials
- Big q-Laguerre polynomials
- Discrete Laguerre polynomials
- Gauss–Laguerre quadrature
- Laguerre-Gaussian modes
- Laguerre form
- Laguerre formula
- Laguerre group
- Laguerre's method
- Laguerre–Pólya class
- Laguerre plane
- Laguerre polynomials
- Laguerre transform
- Laguerre transformations
- Laguerre's theorem
- Laguerre–Forsyth invariant
- Laguerre–Samuelson inequality
- Laguerre–Voronoi diagram
