= Parallel (geometry) =

Relation used in geometry

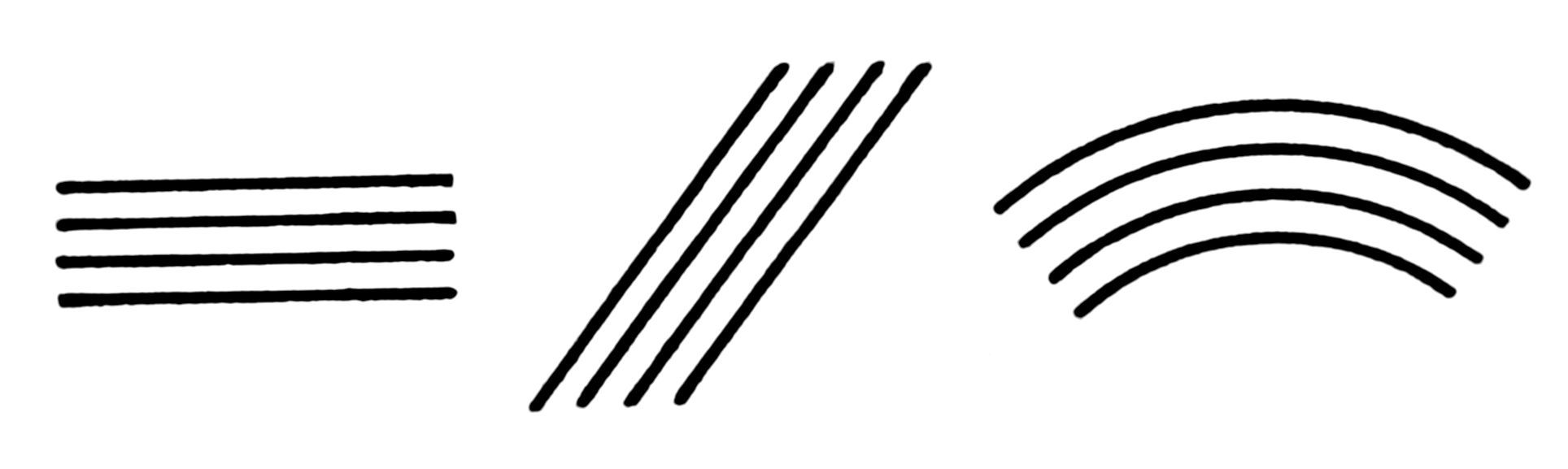
Line art drawing of parallel lines and curves.

In geometry, parallel lines are coplanar infinite straight lines that do not intersect at any point. Parallel planes are infinite flat planes in the same three-dimensional space that never meet. In three-dimensional Euclidean space, a line and a plane that do not share a point are also said to be parallel. However, two noncoplanar lines are called skew lines. Line segments and Euclidean vectors are parallel if they have the same direction or opposite direction (not necessarily the same length).

Parallel lines are the subject of Euclid's parallel postulate. Parallelism is primarily a property of affine geometries and Euclidean geometry is a special instance of this type of geometry. In some other geometries, such as hyperbolic geometry, lines can have analogous properties that are referred to as parallelism. The concept can also be generalized to non-straight parallel curves and non-flat parallel surfaces, which keep a fixed minimum distance and do not touch each other or intersect.

== Symbol ==
The parallel symbol is $\parallel$. For example, $AB \parallel CD$ indicates that line AB is parallel to line CD.

In the Unicode character set, the "parallel" and "not parallel" signs have codepoints U+2225 (∥) and U+2226 (∦), respectively. In addition, U+22D5 (⋕) represents the relation "equal and parallel to".

== Euclidean parallelism ==
=== Two lines in a plane ===
==== Conditions for parallelism ====
As shown by the tick marks, lines a and b are parallel. This can be proved because the transversal t produces congruent corresponding angles $\theta$, shown here both to the right of the transversal, one above and adjacent to line a and the other above and adjacent to line b.

Given parallel straight lines l and m in Euclidean space, the following properties are equivalent:

1. Every point on line m is located at exactly the same (minimum) distance from line l (equidistant lines).
2. Line m is in the same plane as line l but does not intersect l (recall that lines extend to infinity in either direction).
3. When lines m and l are both intersected by a third straight line (a transversal) in the same plane, the corresponding angles of intersection with the transversal are congruent.

Since these are equivalent properties, any one of them could be taken as the definition of parallel lines in Euclidean space, but the first and third properties involve measurement, and so, are "more complicated" than the second. Thus, the second property is the one usually chosen as the defining property of parallel lines in Euclidean geometry. The other properties are then consequences of Euclid's Parallel Postulate.

==== History ====
The definition of parallel lines as a pair of straight lines in a plane which do not meet appears as Definition 23 in Book I of Euclid's Elements. Alternative definitions were discussed by other Greeks, often as part of an attempt to prove the parallel postulate. Proclus attributes a definition of parallel lines as equidistant lines to Posidonius and quotes Geminus in a similar vein. Simplicius also mentions Posidonius' definition as well as its modification by the philosopher Aganis.

At the end of the nineteenth century, in England, Euclid's Elements was still the standard textbook in secondary schools. The traditional treatment of geometry was being pressured to change by the new developments in projective geometry and non-Euclidean geometry, so several new textbooks for the teaching of geometry were written at this time. A major difference between these reform texts, both between themselves and between them and Euclid, is the treatment of parallel lines. These reform texts were not without their critics and one of them, Charles Dodgson (a.k.a. Lewis Carroll), wrote a play, Euclid and His Modern Rivals, in which these texts are lambasted.

One of the early reform textbooks was James Maurice Wilson's Elementary Geometry of 1868. Wilson based his definition of parallel lines on the primitive notion of direction. According to Wilhelm Killing the idea may be traced back to Leibniz. Wilson, without defining direction since it is a primitive, uses the term in other definitions such as his sixth definition, "Two straight lines that meet one another have different directions, and the difference of their directions is the angle between them." Wilson (1868, p. 2) In definition 15 he introduces parallel lines in this way; "Straight lines which have the same direction, but are not parts of the same straight line, are called parallel lines." Wilson (1868, p. 12) Augustus De Morgan reviewed this text and declared it a failure, primarily on the basis of this definition and the way Wilson used it to prove things about parallel lines. Dodgson also devotes a large section of his play (Act II, Scene VI § 1) to denouncing Wilson's treatment of parallels. Wilson edited this concept out of the third and higher editions of his text.

Other properties, proposed by other reformers, used as replacements for the definition of parallel lines, did not fare much better. The main difficulty, as pointed out by Dodgson, was that to use them in this way required additional axioms to be added to the system. The equidistant line definition of Posidonius, expounded by Francis Cuthbertson in his 1874 text Euclidean Geometry suffers from the problem that the points that are found at a fixed given distance on one side of a straight line must be shown to form a straight line. This can not be proved and must be assumed to be true. The corresponding angles formed by a transversal property, used by W. D. Cooley in his 1860 text, The Elements of Geometry, simplified and explained requires a proof of the fact that if one transversal meets a pair of lines in congruent corresponding angles then all transversals must do so. Again, a new axiom is needed to justify this statement.

==== Construction ====
The three properties above lead to three different methods of construction of parallel lines.

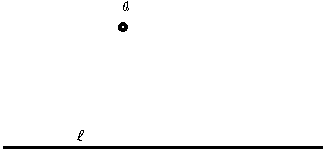
The problem: Draw a line through a parallel to l.

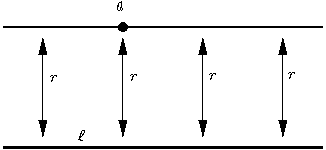
Property 1: Line m has everywhere the same distance to line l.

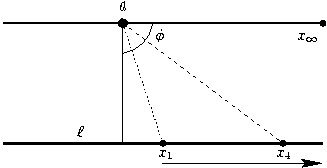
Property 2: Take a random line through a that intersects l in x. Move point x to infinity.

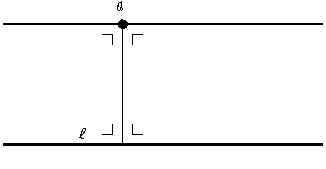
Property 3: Both l and m share a transversal line through a that intersect them at 90°.

==== Distance between two parallel lines ====
Because parallel lines in a Euclidean plane are equidistant, there is a unique distance between the two parallel lines. Given the equations of two non-vertical, non-horizontal parallel lines,

$$y = mx+b_1\,$$
$$y = mx+b_2\,,$$

the distance between the two lines can be found by locating two points (one on each line) that lie on a common perpendicular to the parallel lines and calculating the distance between them. Since the lines have slope m, a common perpendicular would have slope −1/m and we can take the line with equation y = −x/m as a common perpendicular. Solve the linear systems

$$\begin{cases}
y = mx+b_1 \\
y = -x/m
\end{cases}$$

and

$$\begin{cases}
y = mx+b_2 \\
y = -x/m
\end{cases}$$

to get the coordinates of the points. The solutions to the linear systems are the points

$$\left( x_1,y_1 \right)\ = \left( \frac{-b_1m}{m^2+1},\frac{b_1}{m^2+1} \right)\,$$

and

$$\left( x_2,y_2 \right)\ = \left( \frac{-b_2m}{m^2+1},\frac{b_2}{m^2+1} \right).$$

These formulas still give the correct point coordinates even if the parallel lines are horizontal (i.e., m = 0). The distance between the points is

$$d = \sqrt{\left(x_2-x_1\right)^2 + \left(y_2-y_1\right)^2} = \sqrt{\left(\frac{b_1m-b_2m}{m^2+1}\right)^2 + \left(\frac{b_2-b_1}{m^2+1}\right)^2}\,,$$

which reduces to

$$d = \frac{|b_2-b_1|}{\sqrt{m^2+1}}\,.$$

When the lines are given by the general form of the equation of a line (horizontal and vertical lines are included):

$$ax+by+c_1=0\,$$
$$ax+by+c_2=0,\,$$

their distance can be expressed as

$$d = \frac{|c_2-c_1|}{\sqrt {a^2+b^2}}.$$

=== Two lines in three-dimensional space ===
Two lines in the same three-dimensional space that do not intersect need not be parallel. Only if they are in a common plane are they called parallel; otherwise they are called skew lines.

Two distinct lines l and m in three-dimensional space are parallel if and only if the distance from a point P on line m to the nearest point on line l is independent of the location of P on line m. This never holds for skew lines.

=== A line and a plane ===
A line m and a plane q in three-dimensional space, the line not lying in that plane, are parallel if and only if they do not intersect.

Equivalently, they are parallel if and only if the distance from a point P on line m to the nearest point in plane q is independent of the location of P on line m.

=== Two planes ===
Similar to the fact that parallel lines must be located in the same plane, parallel planes must be situated in the same three-dimensional space and contain no point in common.

Two distinct planes q and r are parallel if and only if the distance from a point P in plane q to the nearest point in plane r is independent of the location of P in plane q. This will never hold if the two planes are not in the same three-dimensional space.

== In non-Euclidean geometry ==
In non-Euclidean geometry, the concept of a straight line is replaced by the more general concept of a geodesic, a curve which is locally straight with respect to the metric (definition of distance) on a Riemannian manifold, a surface (or higher-dimensional space) which may itself be curved. In general relativity, particles not under the influence of external forces follow geodesics in spacetime, a four-dimensional manifold with 3 spatial dimensions and 1 time dimension.

In non-Euclidean geometry (elliptic or hyperbolic geometry) the three Euclidean properties mentioned above are not equivalent and only the second one (Line m is in the same plane as line l but does not intersect l) is useful in non-Euclidean geometries, since it involves no measurements. In general geometry the three properties above give three different types of curves, equidistant curves, parallel geodesics and geodesics sharing a common perpendicular, respectively.

=== Hyperbolic geometry ===
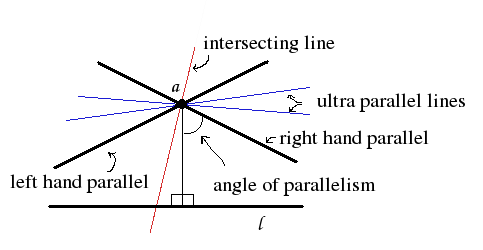
Intersecting, parallel and ultra parallel lines through a with respect to l in the hyperbolic plane. The parallel lines appear to intersect l just off the image. This is just an artifact of the visualisation. On a real hyperbolic plane the lines will get closer to each other and 'meet' in infinity.

While in Euclidean geometry two geodesics can either intersect or be parallel, in hyperbolic geometry, there are three possibilities. Two geodesics belonging to the same plane can either be:

1. intersecting, if they intersect in a common point in the plane,
2. parallel, if they do not intersect in the plane, but converge to a common limit point at infinity (ideal point), or
3. ultra parallel, if they do not have a common limit point at infinity.

In the literature ultra parallel geodesics are often called non-intersecting. Geodesics intersecting at infinity are called limiting parallel.

As in the illustration through a point a not on line l there are two limiting parallel lines, one for each direction ideal point of line l. They separate the lines intersecting line l and those that are ultra parallel to line l.

Ultra parallel lines have single common perpendicular (ultraparallel theorem), and diverge on both sides of this common perpendicular.

=== Spherical or elliptic geometry ===
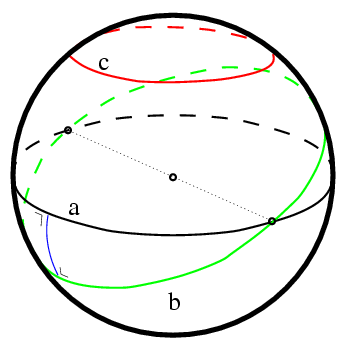
On the sphere there is no such thing as a parallel line. Line a is a great circle, the equivalent of a straight line in spherical geometry. Line c is equidistant to line a but is not a great circle. It is a parallel of latitude. Line b is another geodesic which intersects a in two antipodal points. They share two common perpendiculars (one shown in blue).

In spherical geometry, all geodesics are great circles. Great circles divide the sphere in two equal hemispheres and all great circles intersect each other. Thus, there are no parallel geodesics to a given geodesic, as all geodesics intersect. Equidistant curves on the sphere are called parallels of latitude analogous to the latitude lines on a globe. Parallels of latitude can be generated by the intersection of the sphere with a plane parallel to a plane through the center of the sphere.

== Reflexive variant ==
If l, m, n are three distinct lines, then $l \parallel m \ \land \ m \parallel n \ \implies \ l \parallel n .$

In this case, parallelism is a transitive relation. However, in case l = n, the superimposed lines are not considered parallel in Euclidean geometry. The binary relation between parallel lines is evidently a symmetric relation. According to Euclid's tenets, parallelism is not a reflexive relation and thus fails to be an equivalence relation. Nevertheless, in affine geometry a pencil of parallel lines is taken as an equivalence class in the set of lines where parallelism is an equivalence relation. More generally, a quotient affine space $A/U$ can be defined as the set of all subsets of the affine affine space $A$ which are parallel to $U$.

To this end, Emil Artin (1957) adopted a definition of parallelism where two lines are parallel if they have all or none of their points in common. Then a line is parallel to itself so that the reflexive and transitive properties belong to this type of parallelism, creating an equivalence relation on the set of lines. In the study of incidence geometry, this variant of parallelism is used in the affine plane.

== See also ==
- Clifford parallel
- Collinearity
- Concurrent lines
- Limiting parallel
- Parallel curve
- Ultraparallel theorem
