= Constructions in hyperbolic geometry =

Hyperbolic geometry is a non-Euclidean geometry where the first four axioms of Euclidean geometry are kept but the fifth axiom, the parallel postulate, is changed. The fifth axiom of hyperbolic geometry says that given a line L and a point P not on that line, there are at least two lines passing through P that are parallel to L. As in Euclidean geometry, where ancient Greek mathematicians used a compass and idealized ruler for constructions of lengths, angles, and other geometric figures, constructions can also be made in hyperbolic geometry.

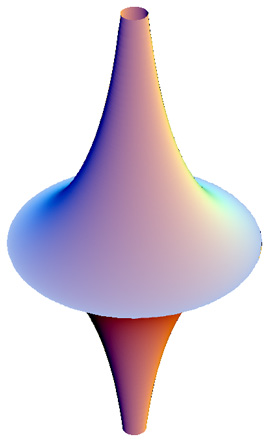
Pseudosphere

== Models of hyperbolic geometry ==
There are a couple of models for hyperbolic geometry, which can make performing and visualizing constructions easier. Portions of the hyperbolic plane can be placed onto a pseudosphere and maintain angles and hyperbolic distances, as well as be bent around the pseudosphere and still keep its properties. However, not the entire hyperbolic plane can be placed onto the pseudosphere as a model, only a portion of the hyperbolic plane.

Poincare disc with hyperbolic parallel lines

The entire hyperbolic plane can also be placed on a Poincaré disk and maintain its angles. However, the lines will turn into circular arcs, which warps them.

== Tools ==
In hyperbolic geometry, one can use the standard ruler and compass that is often used in Euclidean plane geometry. However, there are a variety of compasses and rulers developed for hyperbolic constructions.

A hypercompass can be used to construct a hypercycle given the central line and radius. A horocompass can be used to construct a horocycle through a specific point if the diameter and direction are also provided. Both of these also require a straight edge, like the standard ruler. When doing constructions in hyperbolic geometry, as long as you are using the proper ruler for the construction, the three compasses (meaning the horocompass, hypercompass, and the standard compass) can all perform the same constructions.

A parallel ruler can be used to draw a line through a given point A and parallel to a given ray a. For any two lines, a hyperbolic ruler can be used to construct a line that is parallel to the first line and perpendicular to the second.

A few notes on the uses of rulers are:

- A parallel ruler can be used to construct anything that a standard ruler and the three compasses can also construct
- A parallel ruler can act as a ruler in Euclidean geometry
- A hyperbolic ruler cannot perform Euclidean geometry constructions
- In hyperbolic geometry, constructions that can be done using any one of the three compasses listed above and the parallel ruler can also be done using the hyperbolic ruler

== Simple constructions ==
=== Angle bisector ===
Consider a given angle ᗉ IAI' ≠ π/2 radians whose angle bisector is sought. This results in two different cases: either ᗉ IAI' < π/2 radians or ᗉ IAI' > π/2 radians. For both cases a hyperbolic ruler is needed to construct a line BI' where BI' is perpendicular to AI and parallel to AI'. Also, construct a line B'I where B'I is perpendicular to AI' and parallel to AI.

Case 1: ᗉ IAI'< π/2 radians

Let C be the intersection of BI' and B'I. The result of this is that the line AC bisects ᗉ IAI'.

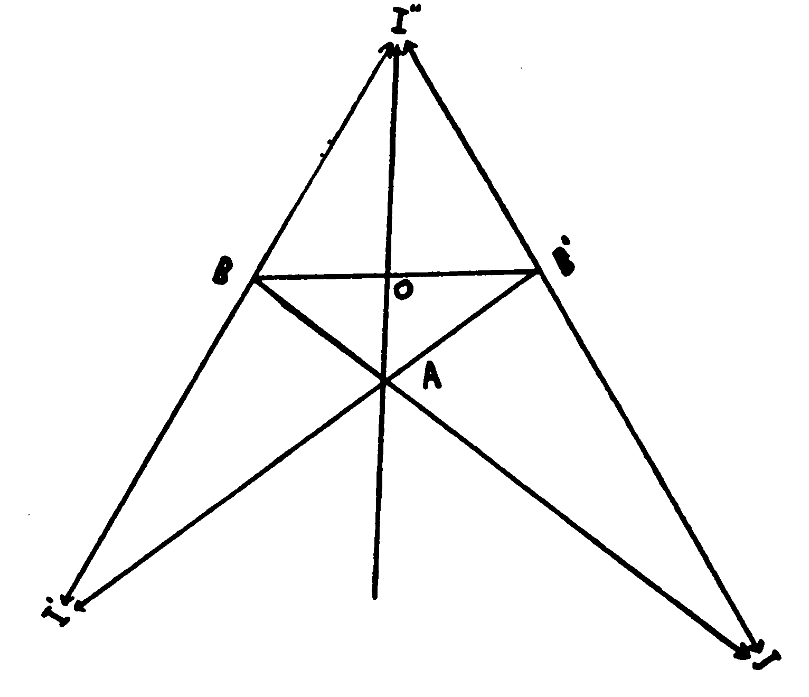
Case 1: ᗉ IAI'< π/2 radians

Case 2: ᗉ IAI' > π/2 radians

This case is further broken down into three sub-cases:

- Case 2a: IB' intersects I'B
  - Let A' be the intersection of IB' and I'B. Then AA' is the angle bisector of ᗉ IAI'.
- Case 2b: IB' is parallel to I'B
  - Construct the line segment BB' and using a hyperbolic ruler, construct the line OI" such that OI" is perpendicular to BB' and parallel to B'I". Then, line OA is the angle bisector for ᗉ IAI'.
- Case 2c: IB' is ultraparallel to I'B.
  - Using the ultraparallel theorem, construct the common perpendicular of IB' and I'B, CC'. Let the intersection of CB" and BC' be D. As a result, AD will be the angle bisector of ᗉ BDB'. We then find that the line through OD is also the angle bisector of ᗉ IAI'.

=== Common parallel line to two lines ===
We consider the problem of finding a line parallel to two given lines, a and a'. There are three cases: a and a' intersect at a point O, a and a' are parallel to each other, and a and a' are ultraparallel to each other.

Case 1: a and a' intersect at a point O,

Bisect one of the angles made by these two lines and name the angle bisector b. Using a hyperbolic ruler, construct a line c such that c is perpendicular to b and parallel to a. As a result, c is also parallel to a', making c the common parallel to lines a and a'.

Case 2: a and a' are parallel to each other

Using a hyperbolic ruler, construct AI' such that AI' is parallel to a' and perpendicular to a. Construct another line A'I such that A'I is parallel to a and perpendicular to a'. Let the intersection of AI' and A'I be B. Because ᗉ IBI' > π/2 radians, the case now plays out like case 1, allowing construction of the common parallel to BI and BI'.

Case 3: a and a' are ultraparallel to each other

Using a hyperbolic ruler, construct BI' such that BI' is perpendicular to a and parallel to a' and construct a line B'I such that B'I is perpendicular to a' and parallel to a in a way that puts BI' and B'I on the same side of the common perpendicular to a and a' , which can be found using the ultraparallel theorem. Let the intersection of BI' and B'I be C. Then ᗉ ICI' ≠ π/2 radians, which allows you to finish the construction like the other two cases.

=== Line perpendicular to another line at a point ===
Suppose you have a line a and a point A on that line, and you want to construct a line perpendicular to a and through A. Then let a' be a line through A where a and a' are two distinct lines. Then you will have one of two cases.

Case 1: a is perpendicular to a'

In this case, we already have the line perpendicular to a through A.

Case 2: a and a' are not perpendicular to each other

Using a hyperbolic ruler, construct a line BI such that BI is perpendicular to a and parallel to a'. Also, construct a line CI' such that CI' is perpendicular to a and parallel to a' but in the opposite direction of BI. Now draw a line II" so that II" is the common parallel to BI and I'C. The ultraparallel theorem now allows us to create the common perpendicular to II" and a because these two lines are ultraparallel. This common perpendicular is now the line perpendicular to a and through A.

=== Midpoint of a line segment ===
Suppose you are trying to find the midpoint of a line segment AB. Then construct the line AI such that AI is through A and perpendicular to AB. Also, construct a line BI' such that BI' intersects AB at B and is perpendicular to AB. Now construct the line II' such that II' is the common parallel to AI and BI'. Construct the common perpendicular to II' and AB, which can be done using the ultraparallel theorem because II' and AB are ultraparallel to each other. Name this line CC'. C now ends up being the midpoint of AB.

== Definitions for complex constructions ==
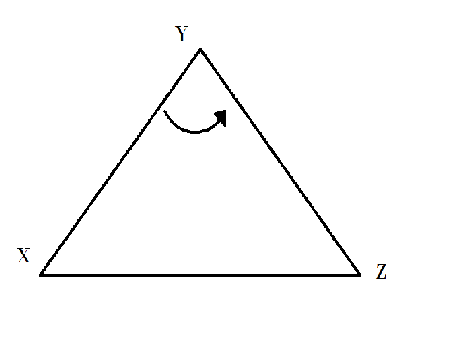
When giving angles a positive or negative sign, angle ᗉ XYZ will be positive if the direction of the shortest path from XY to YZ is counterclockwise

For the purposes of the following definitions, the following assumptions will be made, which usually cannot be made in hyperbolic geometry

- Three distinct points create a unique circle
- Given any two lines, they meet at a unique point (normally, this would contradict the parallel axiom of hyperbolic geometry, since there can be many different lines parallel to the same line)
- Angle measures have signs. Here, they will be defined in the following way: Consider a triangle XYZ. The sign of angle ᗉ XYZ is positive if and only if the direction of the path along the shortest arc from side XY to side YZ is counterclockwise. The picture of the triangle on the right describes this. To make a comparison, when working with the unit circle, the angle measure is positive when going counterclockwise and negative when going clockwise.

=== Cyclic quadrilaterals ===
A quadrilateral is cyclic if the two opposite vertices add up to pi radians or 180 degrees. Also, if a quadrilateral is inscribed in a circle in a way that all of its vertexes lie on the circle, it is cyclic.

=== Pseudoaltitudes ===
Consider triangle ABC where the points are labeled in a clockwise manner so all angles are positive. Let X be a point moving along BC from B to C. As X moves closer to C, angle ᗉAXB will decrease and angle ᗉ AXC will increase. When X is close enough to B, ᗉ AXB > ᗉ AXC. When X is close enough to C, ᗉ AXB < ᗉ AXC. This means that at some point, X will be in a position where ᗉ AXB = ᗉ AXC. When X is in this position, it is defined as the foot of the pseudoaltitude from vertex A. The pseudoaltitude would then be the line segment AX.

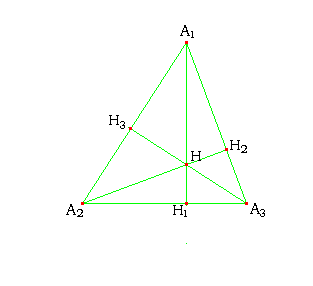
Here, examples of pseudoaltitudes would be A_{1}H_{1}, A_{2}H_{2}, and A_{3}H_{3}.

=== Pseudolengths ===
Let d_{E}(A,B) denote the pseudolength for a given hyperbolic line segment AB. Let a transformation move A to the center of a Poincaré disk with a radius equalling 1. The pseudolength d_{E}(A,B) is the length of this segment in Euclidean geometry.

=== Homothety ===
Given a point P, a point A where A is the center of the homothety, and a number k that represents the ratio of the homothety, a homothety is a transformation that will move P to a point P' where P' is on the ray AP and d_{E}(A,P') = k·d_{E}(A,P).

== Three dunce cap theorem ==
Consider the three circles ω_{1}, ω_{2}, and ω_{3} in a common plane. Let P_{1} be the intersection of the two external tangent lines of ω_{2} and ω_{3}. Let P_{2} and P_{3} be found the same way. The Three Dunce Caps Theorem then says that P_{1}, P_{2}, and P_{3} all lie on the same line.

Proof: Construct a sphere on top of each circle and then construct a plane tangent to these three spheres. The plane intersects the plane that the circles lies on at a straight line containing P_{1}, P_{2}, and P_{3}. These points are also the centers of homothety for the circles that they were derived from.

== Applying to spherical geometry ==
Algebraically, hyperbolic and spherical geometry have the same structure. This allows us to apply concepts and theorems to one geometry to the other. Applying hyperbolic geometry to spherical geometry can make it easier to understand because spheres are much more concrete, which then makes spherical geometry easier to conceptualize.
