= Hyperbolic triangle =

Triangle in hyperbolic geometry

A hyperbolic triangle embedded in a saddle-shaped surface

In hyperbolic geometry, a hyperbolic triangle is a triangle in the hyperbolic plane. It consists of three line segments called sides or edges and three points called angles or vertices.

Just as in the Euclidean case, three points of a hyperbolic space of an arbitrary dimension always lie on the same plane. Hence planar hyperbolic triangles also describe triangles possible in any higher dimension of hyperbolic spaces.

An order-7 triangular tiling has equilateral triangles with 2π/7 radian internal angles.

== Definition ==
A hyperbolic triangle consists of three non-collinear points and the three segments between them.

== Properties ==
Hyperbolic triangles have some properties that are analogous to those of triangles in Euclidean geometry:

- Each hyperbolic triangle has an inscribed circle but not every hyperbolic triangle has a circumscribed circle (see below). Its vertices can lie on a horocycle or hypercycle.

Hyperbolic triangles have some properties that are analogous to those of triangles in spherical or elliptic geometry:

- Two triangles with the same angle sum are equal in area.
- There is an upper bound for the area of triangles.
- There is an upper bound for radius of the inscribed circle.
- Two triangles are congruent if and only if they correspond under a finite product of line reflections.
- Two triangles with corresponding angles equal are congruent (i.e., all similar triangles are congruent).

Hyperbolic triangles have some properties that are the opposite of the properties of triangles in spherical or elliptic geometry:

- The angle sum of a triangle is less than 180°.
- The area of a triangle is proportional to the deficit of its angle sum from 180°.

Hyperbolic triangles also have some properties that are not found in other geometries:

- Some hyperbolic triangles have no circumscribed circle, this is the case when at least one of its vertices is an ideal point or when all of its vertices lie on a horocycle or on a one-sided hypercycle.
- Hyperbolic triangles are thin, there is a maximum distance δ from a point on an edge to one of the other two edges. This principle gave rise to δ-hyperbolic space.

== Triangles with ideal vertices ==
Three ideal triangles in the Poincaré disk model

The definition of a triangle can be generalized, permitting vertices on the ideal boundary of the plane while keeping the sides within the plane. If a pair of sides is limiting parallel (i.e. the distance between them approaches zero as they tend to the ideal point, but they do not intersect), then they end at an ideal vertex represented as an omega point.

Such a pair of sides may also be said to form an angle of zero.

A triangle with a zero angle is impossible in Euclidean geometry for straight sides lying on distinct lines. However, such zero angles are possible with tangent circles.

A triangle with one ideal vertex is called an omega triangle.

Special Triangles with ideal vertices are:

=== Triangle of parallelism ===
A triangle where one vertex is an ideal point, one angle is right: the third angle is the angle of parallelism for the length of the side between the right and the third angle.

=== Schweikart triangle ===
The triangle where two vertices are ideal points and the remaining angle is right, one of the first hyperbolic triangles (1818) described by Ferdinand Karl Schweikart.

=== Ideal triangle ===
The triangle where all vertices are ideal points, an ideal triangle is the largest possible triangle in hyperbolic geometry because of the zero sum of the angles.

== Standardized Gaussian curvature ==
The relations among the angles and sides are analogous to those of spherical trigonometry; the length scale for both spherical geometry and hyperbolic geometry can for example be defined as the length of a side of an equilateral triangle with fixed angles.

The length scale is most convenient if the lengths are measured in terms of the absolute length (a special unit of length analogous to a relations between distances in spherical geometry). This choice for this length scale makes formulas simpler.

In terms of the Poincaré half-plane model absolute length corresponds to the infinitesimal metric $ds=\frac{|dz|}{\operatorname{Im}(z)}$ and in the Poincaré disk model to $ds=\frac{2|dz|}{1-|z|^2}$.

In terms of the (constant and negative) Gaussian curvature K of a hyperbolic plane, a unit of absolute length corresponds to a length of

$$R=\frac{1}{\sqrt{-K}}$$.

In a hyperbolic triangle the sum of the angles A, B, C (respectively opposite to the side with the corresponding letter) is strictly less than a straight angle. The difference between the measure of a straight angle and the sum of the measures of a triangle's angles is called the defect of the triangle. The area of a hyperbolic triangle is equal to its defect multiplied by the square of R:

$$(\pi-A-B-C) R^2{}{}\!$$.

This theorem, first proven by Johann Heinrich Lambert, is related to Girard's theorem in spherical geometry.

=== Planar models ===
A hyperbolic triangle is formed by three hyperbolic lines. These are the straight lines to an observer in the hyperbolic geometry and, given the metric, are the shortest distance paths between pairs of points on the lines. These lines are easily visualized using the half plane and the Poincaré disk planar models of the hyperbolic plane. For an observer in the hyperbolic plane, every position looks the same and there is no preferred direction. A figure can be moved from place to place without changing shape from the observer's viewpoint.

In the half plane model, points with positive imaginary part in the complex plane comprise the hyperbolic plane. The real axis is part of the boundary at infinity. Hyperbolic lines are the parts of circles or lines in the upper half complex plane with $\mathfrak {Im} z>0$ that intersect the real axis at right angles. Möbius transformations transform extended circles to extended circles and preserve angles between intersecting circles. Extended circles are circles and extended lines. Extended lines include the point at infinity. Proper Möbius transformations not involving complex conjugation that transform hyperbolic lines into hyperbolic lines form the subgroup $\text{Möb}^+(\mathbb H)$ and have the form
$$M(z)=\frac{a\,z+b}{c\,z+d}$$

with a,b,c, d real and with $a\,d-b\,c=1$. $\text{Möb}^+(\mathbb H)$ preserves hyperbolic distances. The negative of the complex conjugate given by $M(z)=-\bar z$ maps the real axis into itself and maps the upper half complex plane into itself and transforms hyperbolic lines into hyperbolic lines. When $\text{Möb}^+(\mathbb H)$ is extended with this transformation, the group $\text{Möb}(\mathbb H)$ results. Complex conjugation changes the signs of intersection angles of extended circles, but not their magnitudes.

In the Poincaré disk model, the boundary at infinity is the unit circle $|z|=1$ in the complex plane and the points in the interior comprise the hyperbolic plane. Hyperbolic lines are the interior parts of extended circles intersecting the unit circle at right angles. The Möbius transformations transforming hyperbolic lines into hyperbolic lines form a group and preserve hyperbolic distance. The proper Mobius transformations in the subgroup $\text{Möb}^+(\mathbb D)$ have the form
$$M(z)=\frac{\alpha \,z+ \beta}{\overline{\beta} \,z+\overline{\alpha}}$$
with $| \alpha |^2-|\beta |^2 = 1$. Here $\overline{\alpha}$ denotes the complex conjugate of $\alpha$ and, similarly, $\overline{\beta}$ denotes the complex conjugate of $\beta$. Complex conjugation $M(z)=\overline{z}$ maps the unit circle into itself and maps the interior of the unit circle into itself and maps hyperbolic lines into hyperbolic lines. Angles of intersection change sign but their magnitudes are preserved. Combined with the proper subgroup $\text{Möb}^+(\mathbb D)$, these form the subgroup $\text{Möb}(\mathbb D)$.

There are Möbius transformations which take the interior of the unit circle $|z|<1$ in the complex plane into the upper complex plane $\mathfrak{Im}(z)>0$. Their inverses do the reverse. Results in the Poincaré disk model can be carried over to the upper half plane planar model and vice versa. One such transformation is:

$\xi (z)=\frac{\tfrac{i}{\sqrt2}\,z \,+\tfrac{1}{\sqrt2}}{-\tfrac{1}{\sqrt2}\,z \,-\tfrac{i}{\sqrt2}}$

The unit circle $|z|=1$ is taken into the real axis $\mathfrak{Im} (z)=0$ and the interior of the unit circle $|z|<1$ is taken into the upper half plane $\mathfrak{Im} (z)>0$. This is easily seen. Three points determine an extended circle so since $\xi (-i)=\infty \text{,}\;\; \xi (i)=0\;\; \text{,} \;\; \xi (1)=-1$ and since a Mobius transformation maps extended circles into extended circles, it follow that the unit circle is taken into the extended real axis. An extended line includes the point at infinity. And since $\xi (0)=i$, it follows by continuity that the interior of the unit circle is mapped into the upper half complex plane. The metric also can be shown to map correctly.

== Trigonometry ==
In all the formulas stated below the sides a, b, and c must be measured in absolute length, a unit so that the Gaussian curvature K of the plane is −1. In other words, the quantity R in the paragraph above is supposed to be equal to 1.

Trigonometric formulas for hyperbolic triangles depend on the hyperbolic functions sinh, cosh, and tanh.

=== Trigonometry of right triangles ===
If C is a right angle then:

- The sine of angle A is the hyperbolic sine of the side opposite the angle divided by the hyperbolic sine of the hypotenuse.

$$\sin A=\frac{\textrm{sinh(opposite)}}{\textrm{sinh(hypotenuse)}}=\frac{\sinh a}{\,\sinh c\,}.\,$$

- The cosine of angle A is the hyperbolic tangent of the adjacent leg divided by the hyperbolic tangent of the hypotenuse.

$$\cos A=\frac{\textrm{tanh(adjacent)}}{\textrm{tanh(hypotenuse)}}=\frac{\tanh b}{\,\tanh c\,}.\,$$

- The tangent of angle A is the hyperbolic tangent of the opposite leg divided by the hyperbolic sine of the adjacent leg.

$$\tan A=\frac{\textrm{tanh(opposite)}}{\textrm{sinh(adjacent)}} = \frac{\tanh a}{\,\sinh b\,}$$.

- The hyperbolic cosine of the adjacent leg to angle A is the cosine of angle B divided by the sine of angle A.

$$\textrm{cosh(adjacent)}= \frac{\cos B}{\sin A}$$.

- The hyperbolic cosine of the hypotenuse is the product of the hyperbolic cosines of the legs.

$$\textrm{cosh(hypotenuse)}= \textrm{cosh(adjacent)} \textrm{cosh(opposite)}$$.

- The hyperbolic cosine of the hypotenuse is also the product of the cosines of the angles divided by the product of their sines.

$$\textrm{cosh(hypotenuse)}= \frac{\cos A \cos B}{\sin A\sin B} = \cot A \cot B$$

==== Relations between angles ====
We also have the following equations:

$$\cos A = \cosh a \sin B$$

$$\sin A = \frac{\cos B}{\cosh b}$$

$$\tan A = \frac{\cot B}{\cosh c}$$

$$\cos B = \cosh b \sin A$$

$$\cosh c = \cot A \cot B$$

==== Area ====
The area of a right angled triangle is:

$$\textrm{Area} = \frac{\pi}{2} - \angle A - \angle B$$

also

$\textrm{Area}= 2 \arctan (\tanh (\frac{a}{2})\tanh (\frac{b}{2}) )$

The area for any other triangle is:

$$\textrm{Area} = {\pi} - \angle A - \angle B - \angle C$$

==== Angle of parallelism ====
The instance of an omega triangle with a right angle provides the configuration to examine the angle of parallelism in the triangle.

In this case angle B = 0, a = c = $\infty$ and $\textrm{tanh}(\infty )= 1$, resulting in $\cos A= \textrm{tanh(adjacent)}$.

==== Equilateral triangle ====
The trigonometry formulas of right triangles also give the relations between the sides s and the angles A of an equilateral triangle (a triangle where all sides have the same length and all angles are equal).

The relations are:

$$\cos A= \frac{\textrm{tanh}(\frac12 s) }{\textrm{tanh} (s)}$$

$$\cosh( \frac12 s)= \frac{\cos(\frac12 A)}{\sin( A)}= \frac{1}{2 \sin(\frac12 A)}$$

=== General trigonometry ===
Whether C is a right angle or not, the following relationships hold: The hyperbolic law of cosines is as follows:

$$\cosh c=\cosh a\cosh b-\sinh a\sinh b \cos C,$$

Its dual theorem is

$$\cos C= -\cos A\cos B+\sin A\sin B \cosh c,$$

There is also a law of sines:

$$\frac{\sin A}{\sinh a} = \frac{\sin B}{\sinh b} = \frac{\sin C}{\sinh c},$$

and a four-parts formula:

$$\cos C\cosh a=\sinh a\coth b-\sin C\cot B$$

which is derived in the same way as the analogous formula in spherical trigonometry.

=== Analogies to spherical trigonometry ===
It is easily observed that the two laws of cosines and the law of sines for spherical trigonometry are the same as those of hyperbolic trigonometry if the sides $a \text{,} \, b \text{,} \, c$ are replaced by $i\,a\text{,}\, i\,b\text{,} \, i\,c$ in the formulas for spherical geometry. Here $i$ is the square root of -1. This does not constitute a proof but does mean that further formulas in spherical trigonometry derived from those formulas can be transformed into formulas for hyperbolic trigonometry by making those substitutions. This is so since the circular trigonometric functions are analytic functions and the trigonometric identities are valid for complex arguments. In particular. $\cos(i\,a)=\cosh(a)$,$\sin(i\,a)=i\,\sinh(a)$, $\tan (i\,a)=i\,\tanh (a)$, and $\cot(i\,a)=-i\, \coth (a)$. A hyperbolic triangle in which a b A B are known but c C are not known cannot be solved straightforwardly using the two laws of cosines and the law of sines but can be solved using the Napier's analogies. The methods for solving spherical triangles can then be applied to hyperbolic triangles.

== See also ==
- Pair of pants (mathematics)
- Spherical trigonometry
- Triangle group

For hyperbolic trigonometry:

- Angle of parallelism
- Hyperbolic law of cosines
- Hyperbolic law of sines
- Lambert quadrilateral
- Saccheri quadrilateral
