= Schweickart =

Schweikart may refer to:

- Daniel Louis Schweickart, American engineer
- David Schweickart (born 1942), American mathematician
- Rusty Schweickart (born 1935), American aeronautical engineer, NASA astronaut, research scientist, U.S. Air Force fighter pilot, business executive and government executive

== See also ==
- Schweikart
