= Schweikart =

Schweikart is a surname. Notable people with the surname include:

- Ferdinand Karl Schweikart (1780–1857), German jurist and amateur mathematician
- Hans Schweikart (1895–1975), German film director, actor, and screenwriter
- Larry Schweikart (born 1951), American historian
- Rich Schweikart, fictional character in the American TV series Better Call Saul

== See also ==
- Schweickart, a surname
- Schweikert, a surname
