= Schweikert =

Schweikert is a surname. Notable people with the surname include:

- David Schweikert (born 1962), American politician
- Margarete Schweikert (1887–1957), German composer
- Ulrike Schweikert (born 1966), German writer

== See also ==
- Schweikert Factory, a former factory building in Łódź, Poland
- Schweiker, a surname
- Schweikart, a surname
