= Schweiker =

Schweiker is a surname. Notable people with the surname include:

- Mark Schweiker (born 1953), American businessman and politician
- Richard Schweiker (1926–2015), American businessman and politician
- William Schweiker (born 1953), American academic

== See also ==
- Schweiker v. Chilicky, a 1988 United States Supreme Court decision
- Schweikert, a surname
