= Franz Taurinus =

German mathematician (1794–1874)

Franz Adolph Taurinus (15 November 1794 – 13 February 1874) was a German mathematician who is known for his work on non-Euclidean geometry.

== Life ==
Franz Taurinus was the son of Julius Ephraim Taurinus, a court official of the Count of Erbach-Schönberg, and Luise Juliane Schweikart. He studied law in Heidelberg, Gießen and Göttingen. He lived as a private scholar in Cologne.

== Hyperbolic geometry ==
Taurinus corresponded with his uncle Ferdinand Karl Schweikart (1780–1859), who was a law professor in Königsberg, among other things about mathematics. Schweikart examined a model (after Giovanni Girolamo Saccheri and Johann Heinrich Lambert) in which the parallel postulate is not satisfied, and in which the sum of three angles of a triangle is less than two right angles (which is now called hyperbolic geometry). While Schweikart never published his work (which he called "astral geometry"), he sent a short summary of its main principles by letter to Carl Friedrich Gauß.

Motivated by the work of Schweikart, Taurinus examined the model of geometry on a "sphere" of imaginary radius, which he called "logarithmic-spherical" (now called hyperbolic geometry). He published his "theory of parallel lines" in 1825 and "Geometriae prima elementa" in 1826. For instance, in his "Geometriae prima elementa" on p. 66, Taurinus defined the hyperbolic law of cosines

$$A=\operatorname{arccos}\frac{\cos\left(\alpha\sqrt{-1}\right)-\cos\left(\beta\sqrt{-1}\right)\cos\left(\gamma\sqrt{-1}\right)}{\sin\left(\beta\sqrt{-1}\right)\sin\left(\gamma\sqrt{-1}\right)}$$

When solved for $\cos\left(\alpha\sqrt{-1}\right)$ and using hyperbolic functions, it has the form

$$\cosh\alpha=\cosh\beta\cosh\gamma-\sinh\beta\sinh\gamma\cos A$$

Taurinus described his logarithmic-spherical geometry as the "third system" besides Euclidean geometry and spherical geometry, and pointed out that infinitely many systems exist depending on an arbitrary constant. While he noticed that no contradictions can be found in his logarithmic-spherical geometry, he remained convinced of the special role of Euclidean geometry. According to Paul Stäckel and Friedrich Engel, as well as Zacharias, Taurinus must be given credit as a founder of non-Euclidean trigonometry (together with Gauss), but his contributions cannot be considered as being on the same level as those of the main founders of non-Euclidean geometry, Nikolai Lobachevsky and János Bolyai.

Taurinus corresponded with Gauss about his ideas in 1824. In his reply, Gauss mentioned some of his own ideas on the subject, and encouraged Taurinus to further investigate this topic, but he also told Taurinus not to publicly cite Gauss. When Taurinus sent his works to Gauss, the latter didn't respond – according to Stäckel that was probably due to the fact that Taurinus mentioned Gauss in the prefaces of his books. In addition, Taurinus sent some copies of his "Geometriae prima elementa" to friends and authorities (Stäckel reported a positive reply by Georg Ohm). Dissatisfied with the lack of recognition, Taurinus burnt the remaining copies of that book – the only copy found by Stäckel and Engel was in the library of the University of Bonn. In 2015, another copy of the "Geometriae prima elementa" was digitized and made freely available online by the University of Regensburg.
