= Ideal point =

Point at infinity in hyperbolic geometry

Three ideal triangles in the Poincaré disk model; the vertices are ideal points

In hyperbolic geometry, an ideal point, omega point or point at infinity is a well-defined point outside the hyperbolic plane or space. Given a line l and a point P not on l, right- and left-limiting parallels to l through P converge to l at ideal points.

Unlike the projective case, ideal points form a boundary, not a submanifold. So, these lines do not intersect at an ideal point and such points, although well-defined, do not belong to the hyperbolic space itself.

The ideal points together form the Cayley absolute or boundary of a hyperbolic geometry. For instance, the unit circle forms the Cayley absolute of the Poincaré disk model and the Klein disk model. The real line forms the Cayley absolute of the Poincaré half-plane model.

Pasch's axiom and the exterior angle theorem still hold for an omega triangle, defined by two points in hyperbolic space and an omega point.

== Properties ==
- The hyperbolic distance between an ideal point and any other point or ideal point is infinite.
- The centres of horocycles and horoballs are ideal points; two horocycles are concentric when they have the same centre.

== Polygons with ideal vertices ==
=== Ideal triangles ===
if all vertices of a triangle are ideal points the triangle is an ideal triangle.

Some properties of ideal triangles include:

- All ideal triangles are congruent.
- The interior angles of an ideal triangle are all zero.
- Any ideal triangle has an infinite perimeter.
- Any ideal triangle has area $-\pi / K$ where K is the (always negative) curvature of the plane.

=== Ideal quadrilaterals ===
if all vertices of a quadrilateral are ideal points, the quadrilateral is an ideal quadrilateral.

While all ideal triangles are congruent, not all convex ideal quadrilaterals are. They can vary from each other, for instance, in the angle at which their two diagonals cross each other. Nevertheless all convex ideal quadrilaterals have certain properties in common:

- The interior angles of a convex ideal quadrilateral are all zero.
- Any convex ideal quadrilateral has an infinite perimeter.
- Any convex ideal quadrilateral has area $-2 \pi / K$ where K is the (always negative) curvature of the plane.

=== Ideal square ===
The ideal quadrilateral where the two diagonals are perpendicular to each other form an ideal square.

It was used by Ferdinand Karl Schweikart in his memorandum on what he called "astral geometry", one of the first publications acknowledging the possibility of hyperbolic geometry.

=== Ideal n-gons ===
An ideal n-gon can be subdivided into (n − 2) ideal triangles, with area (n − 2) times the area of an ideal triangle.

== Representations in models of hyperbolic geometry ==
In the Klein disk model and the Poincaré disk model of the hyperbolic plane the ideal points are on the unit circle (hyperbolic plane) or unit sphere (higher dimensions) which is the unreachable boundary of the hyperbolic plane.

When projecting the same hyperbolic line to the Klein disk model and the Poincaré disk model both lines go through the same two ideal points (the ideal points in both models are on the same spot).

=== Klein disk model ===
Given two distinct points p and q in the open unit disk the unique straight line connecting them intersects the unit circle in two ideal points, a and b, labeled so that the points are, in order, a, p, q, b so that |aq| > |ap| and |pb| > |qb|. Then the hyperbolic distance between p and q is expressed as

$$d(p,q) = \frac{1}{2} \log \frac{ \left| qa \right| \left| bp \right| }{ \left| pa \right| \left| bq \right| } ,$$

=== Poincaré disk model ===
Given two distinct points p and q in the open unit disk then the unique circle arc orthogonal to the boundary connecting them intersects the unit circle in two ideal points, a and b, labeled so that the points are, in order, a, p, q, b so that |aq| > |ap| and |pb| > |qb|. Then the hyperbolic distance between p and q is expressed as

$$d(p,q) =  \log \frac{ \left| qa \right| \left| bp \right| }{ \left| pa \right| \left| bq \right| } ,$$

Where the distances are measured along the (straight line) segments aq, ap, pb and qb.

=== Poincaré half-plane model ===
In the Poincaré half-plane model the ideal points are the points on the boundary axis. There is also another ideal point that is not represented in the half-plane model (but rays parallel to the positive y-axis approach it).

=== Hyperboloid model ===
In the hyperboloid model there are no ideal points.

== See also ==
- Ideal triangle
- Ideal polyhedron
- Points at infinity for uses in other geometries.
