= Hypercycle (geometry) =

Type of curve in hyperbolic geometry

A Poincaré disk showing the hypercycle HC that is determined by the straight line L (termed straight because it cuts the horizon at right angles) and point P

In hyperbolic geometry, a hypercycle, hypercircle or equidistant curve is a curve whose points have the same orthogonal distance from a given straight line (its axis).

Given a straight line L and a point P not on L, one can construct a hypercycle by taking all points Q on the same side of L as P, with perpendicular distance to L equal to that of P. The line L is called the axis, center, or base line of the hypercycle. The lines perpendicular to L, which are also perpendicular to the hypercycle, are called the normals of the hypercycle. The segments of the normals between L and the hypercycle are called the radii. Their common length is called the distance or radius of the hypercycle.

The hypercycles through a given point that share a tangent through that point converge towards a horocycle as their distances go towards infinity.

== Properties similar to those of Euclidean lines ==
Hypercycles have some properties similar to those of lines in Euclidean geometry:

- In a plane, given an axis (line) and a point not on that axis, there is only one hypercycle through that point with the given axis (compare with Playfair's axiom for Euclidean geometry).
- No three points of a hypercycle are on a circle.
- A hypercycle is symmetrical to each line perpendicular to it. (Reflecting a hypercycle in a line perpendicular to the hypercycle results in the same hypercycle.)

== Properties similar to those of Euclidean circles ==
Hypercycles in hyperbolic geometry have some properties similar to those of circles in Euclidean geometry:

- A line perpendicular to a chord of a hypercycle at its midpoint is a radius and it bisects the arc subtended by the chord.
  Let A̅B̅ be the chord and M its middle point.
  By symmetry the line R through M perpendicular to A̅B̅ must be orthogonal to the axis L.
  Therefore R is a radius.
  Also by symmetry, R will bisect the arc AB.
- The axis and distance of a hypercycle are uniquely determined.
  Let us assume that a hypercycle C has two different axes L_{1}, L_{2}.
  Using the previous property twice with different chords we can determine two distinct radii R_{1}, R_{2}. R_{1}, R_{2} will then have to be perpendicular to both L_{1}, L_{2}, giving us a rectangle. This is a contradiction because the rectangle is an impossible figure in hyperbolic geometry.
- Two hypercycles have equal distances if and only if they are congruent.
  If they have equal distance, we just need to bring the axes to coincide by a rigid motion and also all the radii will coincide; since the distance is the same, also the points of the two hypercycles will coincide.
  Vice versa, if they are congruent the distance must be the same by the previous property.
- A straight line cuts a hypercycle in at most two points.
  Let the line K cut the hypercycle C in two points A, B. As before, we can construct the radius R of C through the middle point M of A̅B̅. Note that K is ultraparallel to the axis L because they have the common perpendicular R. Also, two ultraparallel lines have minimum distance at the common perpendicular and monotonically increasing distances as we go away from the perpendicular.
  This means that the points of K inside A̅B̅ will have distance from L smaller than the common distance of A and B from L, while the points of K outside A̅B̅ will have greater distance. In conclusion, no other point of K can be on C.
- Two hypercycles intersect in at most two points.
  Let C_{1}, C_{2} be hypercycles intersecting in three points A, B, C.
  If R_{1} is the line orthogonal to A̅B̅ through its middle point, we know that it is a radius of both C_{1}, C_{2}.
  Similarly we construct R_{2}, the radius through the middle point of B̅C̅.
  R_{1}, R_{2} are simultaneously orthogonal to the axes L_{1}, L_{2} of C_{1}, C_{2}, respectively.
  We already proved that then L_{1}, L_{2} must coincide (otherwise we have a rectangle).
  Then C_{1}, C_{2} have the same axis and at least one common point, therefore they have the same distance and they coincide.
- No three points of a hypercycle are collinear.
  If the points A, B, C of a hypercycle are collinear then the chords A̅B̅, B̅C̅ are on the same line K. Let R_{1}, R_{2} be the radii through the middle points of A̅B̅, B̅C̅. We know that the axis L of the hypercycle is the common perpendicular of R_{1}, R_{2}.
  But K is that common perpendicular. Then the distance must be 0 and the hypercycle degenerates into a line.

== Other properties ==
- The length of an arc of a hypercycle between two points is
  - longer than the length of the line segment between those two points,
  - shorter than the length of the arc of one of the two horocycles between those two points, and
  - shorter than any circle arc between those two points.
- A hypercycle and a horocycle intersect in at most two points.
- A hypercycle of radius r with sinh 2r = 1 induces a quasi-symmetry of the hyperbolic plane by inversion. (Such a hypercycle meets its axis at an angle of π/4.) Specifically, a point P in an open half-plane of the axis inverts to P' whose angle of parallelism is the complement of that of P. This quasi-symmetry generalizes to hyperbolic spaces of higher dimension where it facilitates the study of hyperbolic manifolds. It is used extensively in the classification of conics in the hyperbolic plane where it has been called split inversion. Though conformal, split inversion is not a true symmetry since it interchanges the axis with the boundary of the plane and, of course, is not an isometry.

== Length of an arc ==
In the hyperbolic plane of constant curvature −1, the length of an arc of a hypercycle can be calculated from the radius r and the distance between the points where the normals intersect with the axis d using the formula l = d cosh r.

== Construction ==
In the Poincaré disk model of the hyperbolic plane, hypercycles are represented by lines and circle arcs that intersect the boundary circle at non-right angles. The representation of the axis intersects the boundary circle in the same points, but at right angles.

In the Poincaré half-plane model of the hyperbolic plane, hypercycles are represented by lines and circle arcs that intersect the boundary line at non-right angles. The representation of the axis intersects the boundary line in the same points, but at right angles.

== Congruence classes of Steiner parabolas ==
The congruence classes of Steiner parabolas in the hyperbolic plane are in one-to-one correspondence with the hypercycles in a given half-plane H of a given axis. In an incidence geometry, the Steiner conic at a point P produced by a collineation T is the locus of intersections L ∩ T(L) for all lines L through P. This is the analogue of Steiner's definition of a conic in the projective plane over a field. The congruence classes of Steiner conics in the hyperbolic plane are determined by the distance s between P and T(P) and the angle of rotation φ induced by T about T(P). Each Steiner parabola is the locus of points whose distance from a focus F is equal to the distance to a hypercycle directrix that is not a line. Assuming a common axis for the hypercycles, the location of F is determined by φ as follows. Fixing sinh s = 1, the classes of parabolas are in one-to-one correspondence with φ ∈ (0, π/2). In the conformal disk model, each point P is a complex number with |P| < 1. Let the common axis be the real line and assume the hypercycles are in the half-plane H with Im P > 0. Then the vertex of each parabola will be in H, and the parabola is symmetric about the line through the vertex perpendicular to the axis. If the hypercycle is at distance d from the axis, with $\tanh d = \tan\tfrac{\phi}{2},$ then
$$F = \left(\frac{1-\tan\phi}{1+\tan\phi}\right)i.$$
In particular, F = 0 when φ = π/4. In this case, the focus is on the axis; equivalently, inversion in the corresponding hypercycle leaves H invariant. This is the harmonic case, that is, the representation of the parabola in any inversive model of the hyperbolic plane is a harmonic, genus 1 curve.
