= Daniel Louis Schweickart =

Daniel Louis Schweickart is an electrical engineer at the Air Force Research Laboratory in Dayton, Ohio. He was named a Fellow of the Institute of Electrical and Electronics Engineers (IEEE) in 2012 for his contributions to insulation systems and the development of design guidelines for aerospace applications.
