= Ferdinand Karl Schweikart =

German jurist and amateur mathematician (1780–1857)

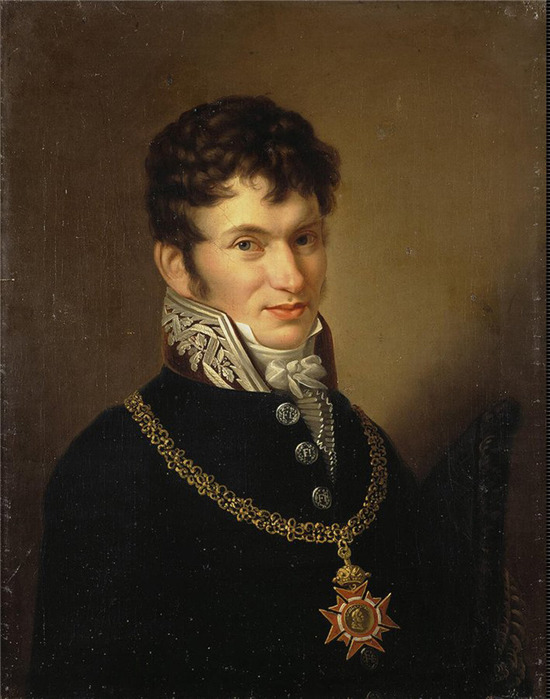
- Born: 28 February 1780; Erbach im Odenwald, Hesse, now Germany
- Died: 17 August 1857 (aged 77); Königsberg, Prussia, now Russia
- Education: University of Marburg
- Scientific career
- Fields: Mathematics, Jurisprudence
- Workplaces: University of Marburg; University of Königsberg

Ferdinand Karl Schweikart (1780–1857) was a German jurist and amateur mathematician who developed an astral geometry before the discovery of non-Euclidean geometry.

== Life and work ==
Schweikart, son of an attorney in Hesse, was educated in the school of his town. He went to the high school in Hanau and Waldeck before entering in 1796 to study law in the university of Marburg, where he attended lectures of the mathematics professor J.K.F. Hauff. He was awarded a doctorate in law at the university of Jena in 1798.

After practicing as a lawyer for a few years in Erbach, he was, from 1803 to 1807, instructor of the youngest prince of Hohenlohe-Ingelfingen. From 1809, he was university professor of jurisprudence successively at the universities of Giessen (1809-1812), Kharkiv (1812-1816), Marburg (1816-1821) and Königsberg (1821 afterwards).

But Schweikart is best remembered for his works on mathematics: in 1807 he published Die Theorie der Parallellinien, nebst dem Vorschlage ihrer Verbannung aus der Geometrie (The theory of parallel lines, along with the suggestions of their banishment from geometry). Then, in 1818 he wrote to Gauss, through his student Christian Ludwig Gerling, about a new geometry, called by him astral geometry, where the sum of the angles of a triangle was less than 180º (as in hyperbolic geometry). He influenced the work of his nephew, the mathematician Franz Taurinus.

== Bibliography ==
- Bardi, Jason Socrates (2009). The fifth postulate: how unraveling a two-thousand-year-old mystery unraveled the universe. Wiley. ISBN 978-0-470-14909-6.
- Gray, Jeremy (2006). "Gauss and Non-Euclidean Geometry". In András Prékopa; Emil Molnár (eds.). Non-Euclidean Geometries. Mathematics and its Applications. Vol. 581. Springer. pp. 61–80. doi:10.1007/0-387-29555-0_2. ISBN 978-0-387-29554-1. S2CID 55674427.
- Halsted, George Bruce (1896). "Subconscious Pangeometry" (PDF). The Monist. 7 (1): 100–106. doi:10.5840/monist1896713. ISSN 0026-9662.
- Winter, Georg (1891). "Schweikart, Ferdinand Karl". Allgemeine Deutsche Biographie (in German). Historischen Kommission bei der Bayerischen Akademie der Wissenschaften. p. 358.
