= Limiting parallel =

Geometrical term

The two lines through a given point P and limiting parallel to line R.

In neutral or absolute geometry, and in hyperbolic geometry, there may be many lines parallel to a given line $R$ through a point $P$ not on line $R$; however, in the plane, two parallels may be closer to $R$ than all others (one in each direction of $R$).

Thus it is useful to make a new definition concerning parallels in neutral geometry. If there are closest parallels to a given line they are known as the limiting parallel, asymptotic parallel or horoparallel (horo from Greek: ὅριον — border).

For rays, the relation of limiting parallel is an equivalence relation, which includes the equivalence relation of being coterminal.

If, in a hyperbolic triangle, the pairs of sides are limiting parallel, then the triangle is an ideal triangle.

== Definition ==
The ray Aa is a limiting parallel to Bb, written: $Aa|||Bb$

A ray $Aa$ is a limiting parallel to a ray $Bb$ if they are coterminal or if they lie on distinct lines not equal to the line $AB$, they do not meet, and every ray in the interior of the angle $BAa$ meets the ray $Bb$.

== Properties ==
Distinct lines carrying limiting parallel rays do not meet.

=== Proof ===
Suppose that the lines carrying distinct parallel rays met. By definition they cannot meet on the side of $AB$ which either $a$ is on. Then they must meet on the side of $AB$ opposite to $a$, call this point $C$. Thus $\angle CAB + \angle CBA < 2 \text{ right angles} \Rightarrow \angle aAB + \angle bBA > 2 \text{ right angles}$. Contradiction.

== See also ==
- horocycle, In Hyperbolic geometry a curve whose normals are limiting parallels
- angle of parallelism
