= Horocycle =

Curve whose normals converge asymptotically

A blue horocycle in the Poincaré disk model and some red normals. The normals converge asymptotically to the upper central ideal point.

In hyperbolic geometry, a horocycle (from Greek roots meaning "boundary circle"), sometimes called an oricycle or limit circle, is a curve of constant curvature where all the perpendicular geodesics (normals) through a point on a horocycle are limiting parallel, and all converge asymptotically to a single ideal point called the centre of the horocycle. In some models of hyperbolic geometry, it looks like the two "ends" of a horocycle get closer and closer to each other and closer to its centre, but this is not true; the two "ends" of a horocycle get further and further away from each other and stay at an infinite distance off its centre. A horosphere is the 3-dimensional version of a horocycle.

In Euclidean space, all curves of constant curvature are either straight lines (geodesics) or circles, but in a hyperbolic space of sectional curvature $-1,$ the curves of constant curvature come in four types: geodesics with curvature $\kappa = 0,$ hypercycles with curvature $0 < |\kappa| < 1,$ horocycles with curvature $|\kappa| = 1,$ and circles with curvature $|\kappa| > 1.$

Any two horocycles are congruent, and can be superimposed by an isometry (translation and rotation) of the hyperbolic plane.

A horocycle can also be described as the limit of the circles that share a tangent at a given point, as their radii tend to infinity, or as the limit of hypercycles tangent at the point as the distances from their axes tends to infinity.

Two horocycles with the same centre are called concentric. As for concentric circles, any geodesic perpendicular to a horocycle is also perpendicular to every concentric horocycle.

== Properties ==
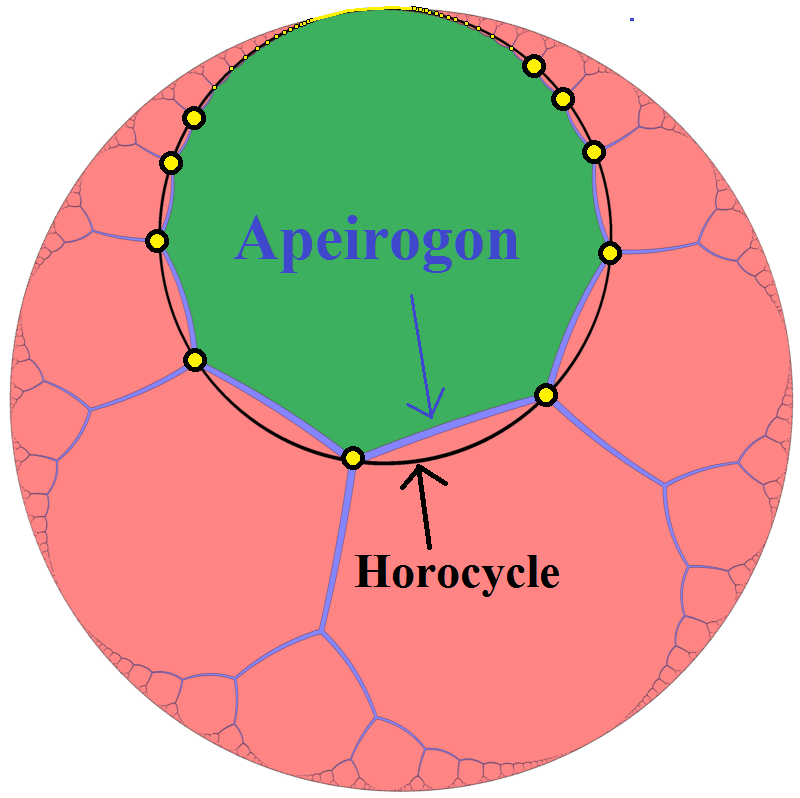

=== Properties similar to those of Euclidean circles ===
Horocycles in hyperbolic geometry have some properties similar to those of circles in Euclidean geometry:

- No three points of a horocycle are on a line, circle or hypercycle.
- Three points that are not on a line, circle or hypercycle are on a horocycle
- A horocycle is a highly symmetric shape: every line through the centre forms a line of reflection symmetry.
- A straight line, circle, hypercycle, or other horocycle cuts a horocycle in at most two points.
- The length of an arc of a horocycle between two points is greater than that of the line segment between those two points.
- The perpendicular bisector of a chord passes through the centre of the horocycle; equivalent statements stemming from the uniqueness of the perpendicular bisector are:
  - A perpendicular line from the centre of a horocycle bisects the chord.
  - The line segment through the centre bisecting a chord is perpendicular to the chord.
- A line drawn perpendicular to a radius through the end point of the radius lying on the horocycle is a tangent to the horocycle.
- A line drawn perpendicular to a tangent through the point of contact with a horocycle passes through the centre of the horocycle.
- From a point outside the horocycle, two tangents can be drawn to the horocycle, and these tangents are equal in length.
- The area of a sector of a horocycle (the area between two radii and the horocycle) is finite.
- If C is the centre of a horocycle and A and B are points on the horocycle then the angles CAB and CBA are equal.

=== Other properties ===
- Through every pair of points there are 2 horocycles. The centres of the horocycles are the ideal points of the perpendicular bisector of the segment between them.
- All horocycles are congruent. (Even concentric horocycles are congruent to each other)
- The length of an arc of a horocycle between two points is:
  - greater than the length of the line segment between those two points,
  - greater than the length of the arc of a hypercycle between those two points and
  - shorter than the length of any circle arc between those two points.
- While the area of a sector of a horocycle is finite, the total area of a horocycle is infinite (a horocycle can be divided in an infinite number of equal sectors)
- A regular apeirogon can be circumscribed and inscribed by two concentric horocycles.
- The distance from a horocycle to its centre is infinite, and while in some models of hyperbolic geometry it looks like the two "ends" of a horocycle get closer and closer together and closer to its centre, this is not true; the two "ends" of a horocycle get further and further away from each other.

=== Horocycles in a hyperbolic plane with standardized Gaussian curvature ===
When the hyperbolic plane has the standardized Gaussian curvature $\kappa = -1$:

- The area of a sector of a horocycle is equal to the length of the arc subtending it.
- The curvature of the horocycle is 1
- The length $s$ of an arc of a horocycle between two points is:
  $$s = 2 \sinh \left( \frac{d}{2}\right) = \sqrt{2 (\cosh d -1) }$$
  where $d$ is the distance between the two points, and $\sinh$ and $\cosh$ are hyperbolic sine and cosine functions.
- The length of an arc of a horocycle such that the tangent at one extremity is limiting parallel to the radius through the other extremity is 1. the area enclosed between this horocycle and the radii is 1.
- The ratio of the arc lengths between two radii of two concentric horocycles where the horocycles are a distance 1 apart is e∶1.

== Representations in models of hyperbolic geometry ==
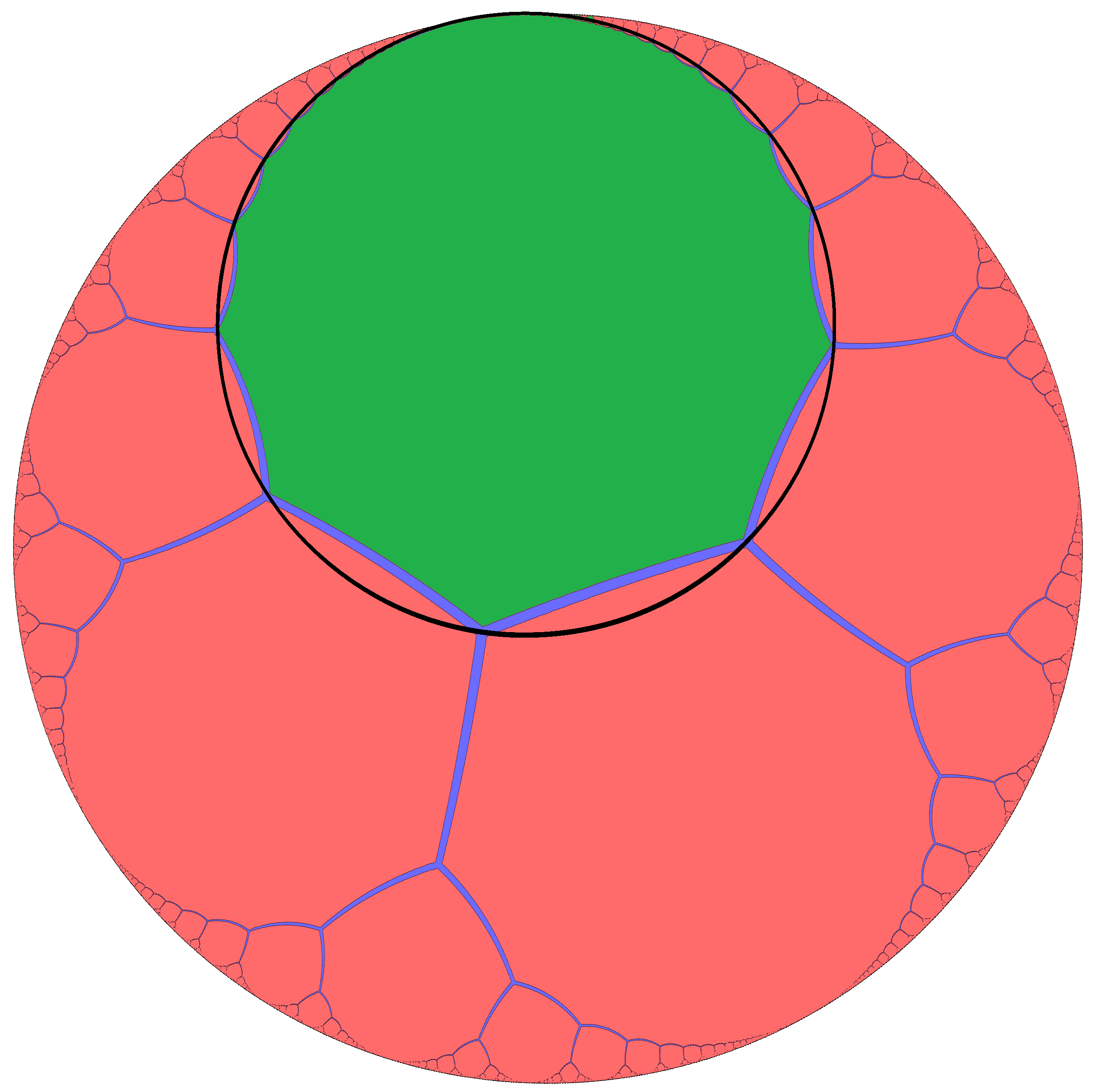
The order-3 apeirogonal tiling, {∞,3}, fills the hyperbolic plane with apeirogons whose vertices exist along horocyclic paths.

=== Poincaré disk model ===
In the Poincaré disk model of the hyperbolic plane, horocycles are represented by circles tangent to the boundary circle; the centre of the horocycle is the ideal point where the horocycle touches the boundary circle.

The compass and straightedge construction of the two horocycles through two points is the same construction of the CPP construction for the Special cases of Apollonius' problem where both points are inside the circle.

In the Poincaré disk model, it looks like points near opposite "ends" of a horocycle get closer to each other and to the center of the horocycle (on the boundary circle), but in hyperbolic geometry every point on a horocycle is infinitely distant from the center of the horocycle. Also the distance between points on opposite "ends" of the horocycle increases as the arc length between those points increases. (The Euclidean intuition can be misleading because the scale of the model increases to infinity at the boundary circle.)

=== Poincaré half-plane model ===
In the Poincaré half-plane model, horocycles are represented by circles tangent to the boundary line, in which case their centre is the ideal point where the circle touches the boundary line.

When the centre of the horocycle is the ideal point at $y = \infty$ then the horocycle is a line parallel to the boundary line.

The compass and straightedge construction in the first case is the same construction as the LPP construction for the Special cases of Apollonius' problem.

=== Hyperboloid model ===
In the hyperboloid model horocycles are represented by intersections of the hyperboloid with planes that generate parabolas on the asymptotic cone (see conic sections " the cutting plane is parallel to exactly one generating line of the cone " ) The normal of the cutting plane is a null vector in three-dimensional Minkowski space.

== Metric ==
If the metric is normalized to have Gaussian curvature −1, then the horocycle is a curve of geodesic curvature 1 at every point.

== Horocycle flow ==
Every horocycle is the orbit of a unipotent subgroup of PSL(2,R) in the hyperbolic plane. Moreover, the displacement at unit speed along the horocycle tangent to a given unit tangent vector induces a flow on the unit tangent bundle of the hyperbolic plane. This flow is called the horocycle flow of the hyperbolic plane.

Identifying the unit tangent bundle with the group PSL(2,R), the horocycle flow is given by the right-action of the unipotent subgroup $U = \{u_t,\, t \in \mathbb R \}$, where:
$$u_t = \pm\left(\begin{array}{cc} 1 & t \\ 0 & 1 \end{array}\right).$$
That is, the flow at time $t$ starting from a vector represented by $g \in \mathrm{PSL}_2(\mathbb R)$ is equal to $gu_t$.

If $S$ is a hyperbolic surface its unit tangent bundle also supports a horocycle flow. If $S$ is uniformised as $S = \Gamma \backslash \mathbb H^2$ the unit tangent bundle is identified with $\Gamma \backslash \mathrm{PSL}_2(\mathbb R)$ and the flow starting at $\Gamma g$ is given by $t \mapsto \Gamma gu_t$. When $S$ is compact, or more generally when $\Gamma$ is a lattice, this flow is ergodic (with respect to the normalised Liouville measure). Moreover, in this setting Ratner's theorems describe very precisely the possible closures for its orbits.

== See also ==
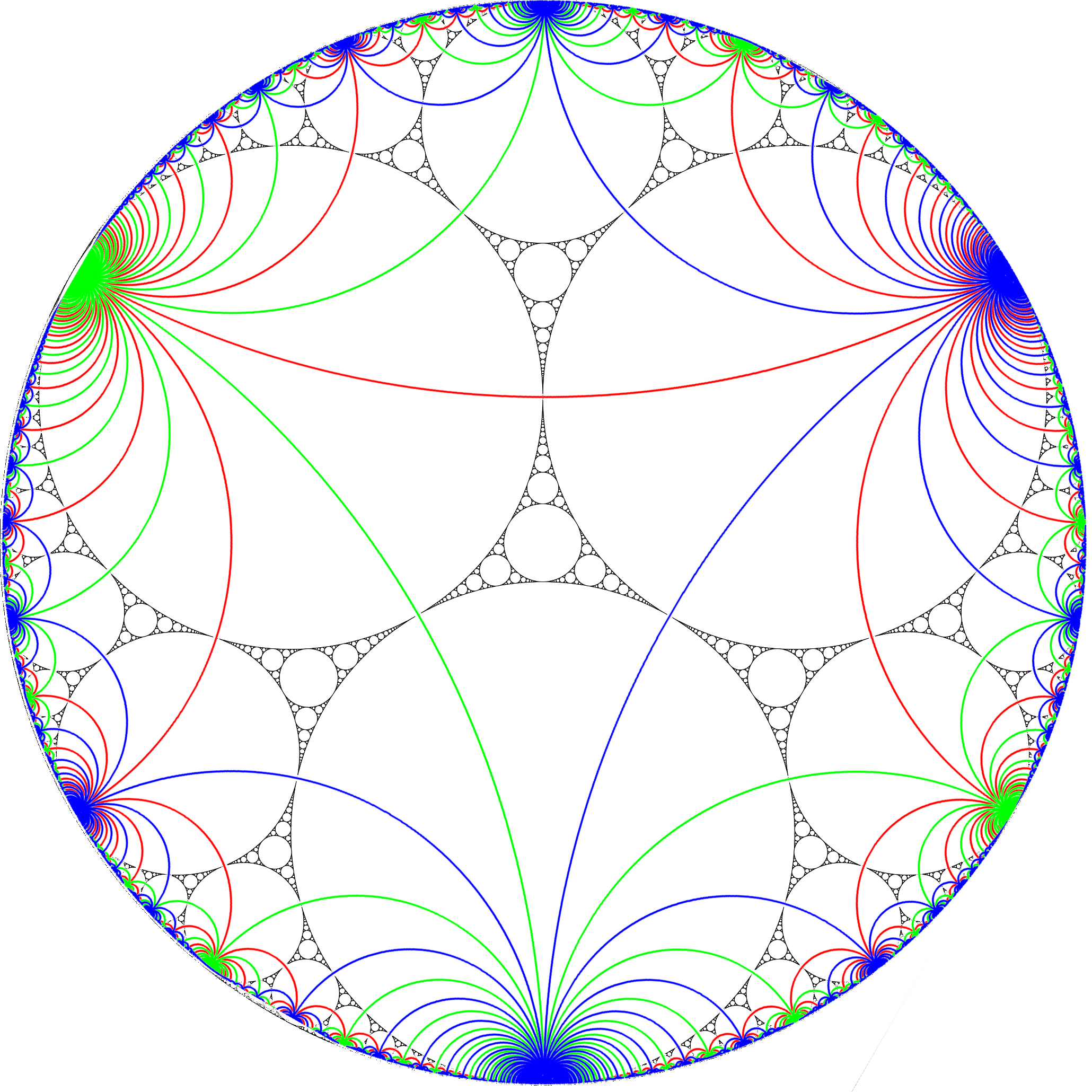
Circles seen in an Apollonian gasket that are tangent to the external circle can be considered horocycles in a Poincaré disk model

- Horosphere
- Hypercycle (geometry)
