= Ideal triangle =

Type of hyperbolic triangle

Three ideal triangles in the Poincaré disk model creating an ideal pentagon

Two ideal triangles in the Poincaré half-plane model

In hyperbolic geometry an ideal triangle is a hyperbolic triangle whose three vertices all are ideal points. Ideal triangles are also sometimes called triply asymptotic triangles or trebly asymptotic triangles. The vertices are sometimes called ideal vertices. All ideal triangles are congruent.

== Properties ==
Ideal triangles have the following properties:

- All ideal triangles are congruent to each other.
- The interior angles of an ideal triangle are all zero.
- An ideal triangle has infinite perimeter.
- An ideal triangle is the largest possible triangle in hyperbolic geometry.

In the standard hyperbolic plane (a surface where the constant Gaussian curvature is −1) we also have the following properties:

- Any ideal triangle has area π.

=== Distances in an ideal triangle ===
Dimensions related to an ideal triangle and its incircle, depicted in the Beltrami–Klein model (left) and the Poincaré disk model (right)

- The inscribed circle to an ideal triangle has radius

$r=\ln\sqrt{3} = \frac{1}{2} \ln 3 = \operatorname{artanh}\frac{1}{2} = 2 \operatorname{artanh}(2- \sqrt{3}) =$ $= \operatorname{arsinh}\frac{1}{3}\sqrt{3} = \operatorname{arcosh}\frac{2}{3}\sqrt{3} \approx 0.549$ .

The distance from any point in the triangle to the closest side of the triangle is less than or equal to the radius r above, with equality only for the center of the inscribed circle.

- The inscribed circle meets the triangle in three points of tangency, forming an equilateral contact triangle with side length $d = \ln\left(\frac{\sqrt 5 + 1}{\sqrt 5 - 1}\right)= 2\ln\varphi\approx 0.962$ where $\varphi=\frac{1+\sqrt 5}{2}$ is the golden ratio.

A circle with radius d around a point inside the triangle will meet or intersect at least two sides of the triangle.

- The distance from any point on a side of the triangle to another side of the triangle is equal or less than $a = \ln\left(1+ \sqrt 2\right) \approx 0.881$, with equality only for the points of tangency described above.

a is also the altitude of the Schweikart triangle.

== Thin triangle condition ==
The δ-thin triangle condition used in δ-hyperbolic space

Because the ideal triangle is the largest possible triangle in hyperbolic geometry, the measures above are maxima possible for any hyperbolic triangle. This fact is important in the study of δ-hyperbolic space.

== Models ==
In the Poincaré disk model of the hyperbolic plane, an ideal triangle is bounded by three circles which intersect the boundary circle at right angles.

In the Poincaré half-plane model, an ideal triangle is modeled by an arbelos, the figure between three mutually tangent semicircles.

In the Beltrami–Klein model of the hyperbolic plane, an ideal triangle is modeled by a Euclidean triangle that is circumscribed by the boundary circle. Note that in the Beltrami-Klein model, the angles at the vertices of an ideal triangle are not zero, because the Beltrami-Klein model, unlike the Poincaré disk and half-plane models, is not conformal i.e. it does not preserve angles.

== Real ideal triangle group ==
The Poincaré disk model tiled with ideal triangles
The ideal (∞ ∞ ∞) triangle group	Another ideal tiling

The real ideal triangle group is the reflection group generated by reflections of the hyperbolic plane through the sides of an ideal triangle. Algebraically, it is isomorphic to the free product of three order-two groups (Schwartz 2001).

== Bibliography ==
- Schwartz, Richard Evan (2001). "Ideal triangle groups, dented tori, and numerical analysis". Annals of Mathematics. Ser. 2. 153 (3): 533–598. arXiv:math.DG/0105264. doi:10.2307/2661362. JSTOR 2661362. MR 1836282.
