= Poincaré metric =

Metric tensor describing constant negative (hyperbolic) curvature

In mathematics, the Poincaré metric, named after Henri Poincaré, is the metric tensor describing a two-dimensional surface of constant negative curvature. It is the natural metric commonly used in a variety of calculations in hyperbolic geometry or Riemann surfaces.

There are three equivalent representations commonly used in two-dimensional hyperbolic geometry. One is the Poincaré half-plane model, defining a model of hyperbolic space on the upper half-plane. The Poincaré disk model defines a model for hyperbolic space on the unit disk. The disk and the upper half plane are related by a conformal map, and isometries are given by Möbius transformations. A third representation is on the punctured disk, where relations for q-analogues are sometimes expressed. These various forms are reviewed below.

== Overview of metrics on Riemann surfaces ==
A metric on the complex plane may be generally expressed in the form

$$ds^2=\lambda^2(z,\overline{z})\, dz\,d\overline{z}$$

where λ is a real, positive function of $z$ and $\overline{z}$. The length of a curve γ in the complex plane is thus given by

$$l(\gamma)=\int_\gamma \lambda(z,\overline{z})\, |dz|$$

The area of a subset of the complex plane is given by

$$\text{Area}(M)=\int_M \lambda^2 (z,\overline{z})\,\frac{i}{2}\,dz \wedge d\overline{z}$$

where $\wedge$ is the exterior product used to construct the volume form. The determinant of the metric is equal to $\lambda^4$, so the square root of the determinant is $\lambda^2$. The Euclidean volume form on the plane is $dx\wedge dy$ and so one has

$$dz \wedge d\overline{z}=(dx+i\,dy)\wedge (dx-i \, dy)= -2i\,dx\wedge dy.$$

A function $\Phi(z,\overline{z})$ is said to be the potential of the metric if

$$4\frac{\partial}{\partial z}
\frac{\partial}{\partial \overline{z}} \Phi(z,\overline{z})=\lambda^2(z,\overline{z}).$$

The Laplace–Beltrami operator is given by

$$\Delta = \frac{4}{\lambda^2}
\frac {\partial}{\partial z}
\frac {\partial}{\partial \overline{z}}
= \frac{1}{\lambda^2} \left(
\frac {\partial^2}{\partial x^2} +
\frac {\partial^2}{\partial y^2}
\right).$$

The Gaussian curvature of the metric is given by

$$K=-\Delta \log \lambda.\,$$

This curvature is one-half of the Ricci scalar curvature.

Isometries preserve angles and arc-lengths. On Riemann surfaces, isometries are identical to changes of coordinate: that is, both the Laplace–Beltrami operator and the curvature are invariant under isometries. Thus, for example, let S be a Riemann surface with metric $\lambda^2(z,\overline{z})\, dz \, d\overline{z}$ and T be a Riemann surface with metric $\mu^2(w,\overline{w})\, dw\,d\overline{w}$. Then a map

$$f:S\to T\,$$

with $f=w(z)$ is an isometry if and only if it is conformal and if

$$\mu^2(w,\overline{w}) \;
\frac {\partial w}{\partial z}
\frac {\partial \overline {w}} {\partial \overline {z}} =
\lambda^2 (z, \overline {z})$$.

Here, the requirement that the map is conformal is nothing more than the statement

$$w(z,\overline{z})=w(z),$$

that is,

$$\frac{\partial}{\partial \overline{z}} w(z) = 0.$$

== Metric and volume element on the Poincaré plane ==
The Poincaré metric tensor in the Poincaré half-plane model is given on the upper half-plane H as

$$ds^2=\frac{dx^2+dy^2}{y^2}=\frac{dz \, d\overline{z}}{y^2}$$

where we write $dz=dx+i\,dy$ and $d\overline{z}=dx-i\,dy$. This metric tensor is invariant under the action of SL(2,R). That is, if we write

$$z'=x'+iy'=\frac{az+b}{cz+d}$$

for $ad-bc=1$ then we can work out that

$$x'=\frac{ac(x^2+y^2)+x(ad+bc)+bd}{|cz+d|^2}$$

and

$$y'=\frac{y}{|cz+d|^2}.$$

The infinitesimal transforms as

$$dz'= \frac{\partial}{\partial z} \Big(\frac{az+b}{cz+d}\Big) \, dz = \frac{a (cz+d) - c(az+b)}{(cz+d)^2} \, dz = \frac{acz+ad - caz-cb}{(cz+d)^2} \, dz = \frac{ad-cb}{(cz+d)^2} \, dz \,\,\overset{ad-cb = 1}{=}\,\, \frac{1}{(cz+d)^2} \, dz = \frac{dz}{(cz+d)^2}$$

and so

$$dz'd\overline{z}' = \frac{dz\,d\overline{z}}{|cz+d|^4}$$

thus making it clear that the metric tensor is invariant under SL(2,R). Indeed,

$$\frac{dz' \, d\overline{z}'}{y'^2} = \frac{\frac{dz d\overline{z}}{|cz+d|^4}}{\frac{y^2}{|cz+d|^4}} = \frac{dz \, d\overline{z}}{y^2}.$$

The invariant volume element is given by

$$d\mu=\frac{dx\,dy}{y^2}.$$

The metric is given by

$$\rho(z_1,z_2)=2\tanh^{-1}\frac{|z_1-z_2|}{|z_1-\overline{z_2}|}$$

$$\rho(z_1,z_2)=\log\frac{|z_1-\overline{z_2}|+|z_1-z_2|}{|z_1-\overline{z_2}|-|z_1-z_2|}$$

for $z_1,z_2 \in \mathbb{H}.$

Another interesting form of the metric can be given in terms of the cross-ratio. Given any four points $z_1, z_2, z_3$ and $z_4$ in the compactified complex plane $\hat{\Complex} = \Complex \cup \{\infty\},$ the cross-ratio is defined by

$$(z_1, z_2; z_3, z_4) =  \frac{(z_1-z_3)(z_2-z_4)}{(z_1-z_4)(z_2-z_3)}.$$

Then the metric is given by

$$\rho(z_1,z_2)= \log \left (z_1, z_2; z_1^\times, z_2^\times \right ).$$

Here, $z_1^\times$ and $z_2^\times$ are the endpoints, on the real number line, of the geodesic joining $z_1$ and $z_2$. These are numbered so that $z_1$ lies in between $z_1^\times$ and $z_2$.

The geodesics for this metric tensor are circular arcs perpendicular to the real axis (half-circles whose origin is on the real axis) and straight vertical lines ending on the real axis.

== Conformal map of plane to disk ==
The upper half plane can be mapped conformally to the unit disk with the Möbius transformation

$$w=e^{i\phi}\frac{z-z_0}{z-\overline {z_0}}$$

where w is the point on the unit disk that corresponds to the point z in the upper half plane. In this mapping, the constant z_{0} can be any point in the upper half plane; it will be mapped to the center of the disk. The real axis $\Im z =0$ maps to the edge of the unit disk $|w|=1.$ The constant real number $\phi$ can be used to rotate the disk by an arbitrary fixed amount.

The canonical mapping is

$$w=\frac{iz+1}{z+i}$$

which takes i to the center of the disk, and 0 to the bottom of the disk.

== Metric and volume element on the Poincaré disk ==
The Poincaré metric tensor in the Poincaré disk model is given on the open unit disk

$$U= \left \{z=x+iy:|z|=\sqrt{x^2+y^2} < 1 \right \}$$

by

$$ds^2=\frac{4(dx^2+dy^2)}{(1-(x^2+y^2))^2}=\frac{4 dz\,d\overline{z}}{(1-|z|^2)^2}.$$

The volume element is given by

$$d\mu=\frac{4 dx\,dy}{(1-(x^2+y^2))^2}=\frac{4 dx\,dy}{(1-|z|^2)^2}.$$

The Poincaré metric is given by

$$\rho(z_1,z_2)=2\tanh^{-1}\left|\frac{z_1-z_2}{1-z_1\overline{z_2}}\right|$$

for $z_1,z_2 \in U.$

The geodesics for this metric tensor are circular arcs whose endpoints are orthogonal to the boundary of the disk. Geodesic flows on the Poincaré disk are Anosov flows; that article develops the notation for such flows.

== The punctured disk model ==
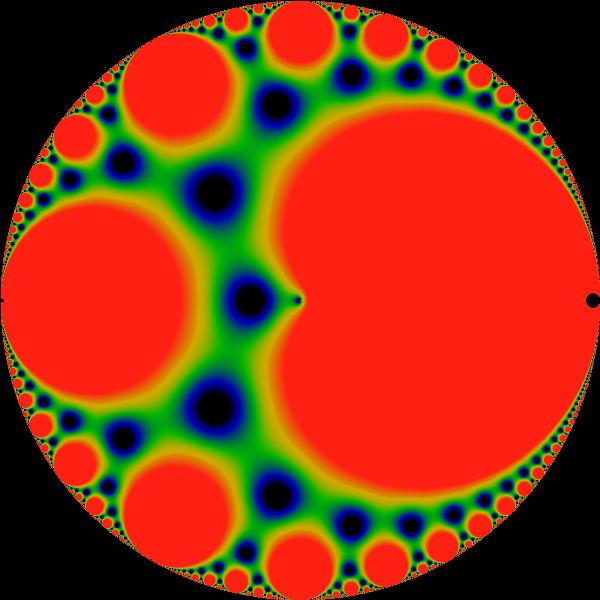
J-invariant in punctured disk coordinates; that is, as a function of the nome.

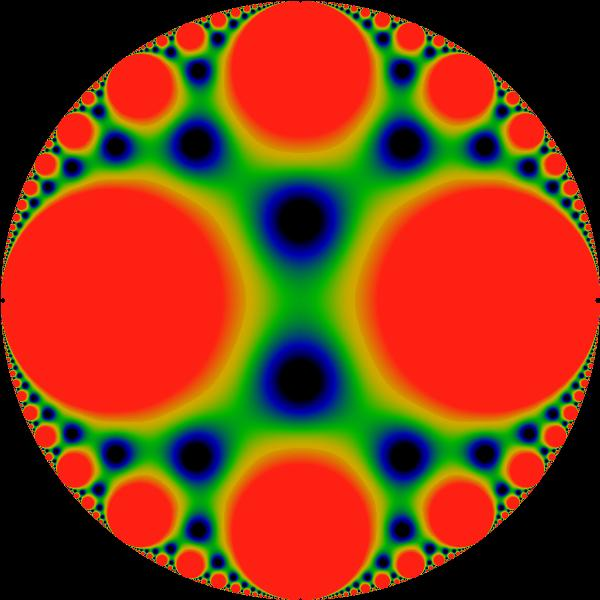
J-invariant in Poincare disk coordinates; note this disk is rotated by 90 degrees from canonical coordinates given in this article

A second common mapping of the upper half-plane to a disk is the q-mapping

$$q=\exp(i\pi\tau)$$

where q is the nome and τ is the half-period ratio:

$$\tau = \frac{\omega_2}{\omega_1}$$.

In the notation of the previous sections, τ is the coordinate in the upper half-plane $\Im \tau >0$. The mapping is to the punctured disk, because the value q=0 is not in the image of the map.

The Poincaré metric on the upper half-plane induces a metric on the q-disk

$$ds^2=\frac{4}{|q|^2 (\log |q|^2)^2} dq \, d\overline{q}$$

The potential of the metric is

$$\Phi(q,\overline{q})=4 \log \log |q|^{-2}$$

== Schwarz lemma ==
The Poincaré metric is distance-decreasing on harmonic functions. This is an extension of the Schwarz lemma, called the Schwarz–Ahlfors–Pick theorem.

== See also ==
- Fuchsian group
- Fuchsian model
- Kleinian group
- Kleinian model
- Poincaré disk model
- Poincaré half-plane model
- Prime geodesic
