= Poisson boundary =

Mathematical measure space associated to a random walk

In mathematics, the Poisson boundary is a probability space associated to a random walk. It is an object designed to encode the asymptotic behaviour of the random walk, i.e. how trajectories diverge when the number of steps goes to infinity. Despite being called a boundary, it is in general a purely measure-theoretical object and not a boundary in the topological sense. However, in the case where the random walk is on a topological space, the Poisson boundary can be related to the Martin boundary, which is an analytic construction yielding a genuine topological boundary. Both boundaries are related to harmonic functions on the space via generalisations of the Poisson formula.

A related construction is the Furstenberg boundary of a semisimple Lie group.

== The case of the hyperbolic plane ==
The Poisson formula states that given a positive harmonic function $f$ on the unit disc $\mathbb D = \{ z \in \mathbb C : |z| < 1\}$ (that is, $\Delta f = 0$ where $\Delta$ is the Laplace–Beltrami operator associated to the Poincaré metric on $\mathbb D$) there exists a unique measure $\mu$ on the boundary $\partial \mathbb D = \{ z \in \mathbb C : |z| = 1\}$ such that the equality

$f(z) = \int_{\partial \mathbb D} K(z, \xi) \, d\mu(\xi)$ where $K(z, \xi) = \frac {1 - |z|^2}{|\xi - z|^2}$ is the Poisson kernel,

holds for all $z \in \mathbb D$. One way to interpret this is that the functions $K(\cdot, \xi)$ for $\xi \in \partial \mathbb D$ are up to scaling all the extreme points in the cone of nonnegative harmonic functions. This analytical interpretation of the set $\partial \mathbb D$ leads to the more general notion of minimal Martin boundary (which in this case is the full Martin boundary).

This fact can also be interpreted in a probabilistic manner. If $W_t$ is the Brownian motion on $\mathbb D$ with the Poincaré Riemannian metric, then the process $f(W_t)$ is a continuous-time martingale, and as such converges almost everywhere to a function on the Wiener space of possible (infinite) trajectories for $W_t$. Thus the Poisson formula identifies this measured space with the Martin boundary constructed above, and ultimately to $\partial \mathbb D$ endowed with the class of Lebesgue measure (note that this identification can be made directly since a path in Wiener space converges almost surely to a point on $\partial \mathbb D$). This interpretation of $\partial \mathbb D$ as the space of trajectories for a Markov process is a special case of the construction of the Poisson boundary.

Finally, the constructions above can be discretised, i.e. restricted to the random walks on the orbits of a Fuchsian group acting on $\mathbb D$. This gives an identification of the extremal positive harmonic functions on the group, and to the space of trajectories of the random walk on the group (both with respect to a given probability measure), with the topological/measured space $\mathbb D$.

== Definition ==
=== The Poisson boundary of a random walk on a discrete group ===
Let $G$ be a discrete group and $\mu$ a probability measure on $G$, which will be used to define a random walk $X_t$ on $G$ (a discrete-time Markov process whose transition probabilities are $p(x, y) = \mu(x^{-1}y)$); the measure $\mu$ is called the step distribution for the random walk. Let $m$ be another measure on $G$, which will be the initial state for the random walk. The space $G^{\mathbb N}$ of trajectories for $X_t$ is endowed with a measure $\mathbb P_m$ whose marginales are $m*\mu^{*n}$ (where $*$ denotes convolution of measures; this is the distribution of the random walk after $n$ steps). There is also an equivalence relation $\sim$ on $G^{\mathbb N}$, which identifies $(x_t)$ to $(y_t)$ if there exists $n, m \in \mathbb N$ such that $x_{t+n} = y_{t+m}$ for all $t \ge 0$ (the two trajectories have the same "tail"). The Poisson boundary of $(G, \mu)$ is then the measured space $\Gamma$ obtained as the quotient of $(G^{\mathbb N}, \mathbb P_m)$ by the equivalence relation $\sim$.

If $\theta$ is the initial distribution of a random walk with step distribution $\mu$ then the measure $\nu_\theta$ on $\Gamma$ obtained as the pushforward of $\mathbb P_\theta$. It is a stationary measure for $(G, \mu)$, meaning that for every measurable set $A$ in the Poisson boundary

$$\int_G \nu(g^{-1}A) \mu(g) = \nu_\theta(A).$$

It is possible to give an implicit definition of the Poisson boundary as the maximal $G$-set with a $(G, \mu)$-stationary measure $\nu$, satisfying the additional condition that $(X_t)_*\nu$ almost surely weakly converges to a Dirac mass.

=== The Poisson formula ===
Let $f$ be a $\mu$-harmonic function on $G$, meaning that $\sum_{h\in G} f(gh)\mu(h) = f(g)$. Then the random variable $f(X_t)$ is a discrete-time martingale and so it converges almost surely. Denote by $\hat f$ the function on $\Gamma$ obtained by taking the limit of the values of $f$ along a trajectory (this is defined almost everywhere on $G^{\mathbb N}$ and shift-invariant). Let $x \in G$ and let $\nu_x$ be the measure obtained by the construction above with $\theta = \delta_x$ (the Dirac mass at $x$). If $f$ is either positive or bounded then $\hat f$ is as well and we have the Poisson formula:

$$f(x) = \int_\Gamma \hat f(\gamma) \, d\nu_x(\gamma).$$

This establishes a bijection between $\mu$-harmonic bounded functions and essentially bounded measurable functions on $\Gamma$. In particular the Poisson boundary of $(G, \mu)$ is trivial, that is reduced to a point, if and only if the only bounded $\mu$-harmonic functions on $G$ are constant.

=== General definition ===
The general setting is that of a Markov operator on a measured space, a notion which generalises the Markov operator $f \mapsto f*\mu$ associated to a random walk. Much of the theory can be developed in this abstract and very general setting.

== The Martin boundary ==
=== Martin boundary of a discrete group ===
Let $G, \mu$ be a random walk on a discrete group. Let $p_n(x, y)$ be the probability to get from $x$ to $y$ in $n$ steps, i.e. $\mu^{*n}(x^{-1}y)$. The Green kernel is by definition:

$$\mathcal G(x, y) = \sum_{n \ge 1} p_n(x, y).$$

If the walk is transient then this series is convergent for all $x, y$. Fix a point $o \in G$ and define the Martin kernel by: $\mathcal K_o(x, y) = \frac{\mathcal G(x, y)}{\mathcal G(o, y)}$. The embedding $y \mapsto \mathcal K_o( \cdot, y)$ has a relatively compact image for the topology of pointwise convergence, and the Martin compactification is the closure of this image. A point $\gamma \in \Gamma$ is usually represented by the notation $\mathcal K(\cdot, \gamma)$.

The Martin kernels are positive harmonic functions and every positive harmonic function can be expressed as an integral of functions on the boundary, that is for every positive harmonic function there is a measure $\nu_{o, f}$ on $\Gamma$ such that a Poisson-like formula holds:

$$f(x) = \int \mathcal K_o(x, \gamma) \, d\nu_{o, f}(\gamma).$$

The measures $\nu_{o, f}$ are supported on the minimal Martin boundary, whose elements can also be characterised by being minimal. A positive harmonic function $u$ is said to be minimal if for any harmonic function $v$ with $0 \le v \le u$ there exists $c \in [0, 1]$ such that $v = cu$.

There is actually a whole family of Martin compactifications. Define the Green generating series as

$$\mathcal  G_r(x, y) = \sum_{n \ge 1} p_n(x, y)r^n.$$

Denote by $R$ the radius of convergence of this power series and define for $1\leq r \leq R$ the $r$-Martin kernel by $\mathcal K_{o,r}(x, y) = \frac{\mathcal G_r(x, y)}{\mathcal G_r(o, y)}$. The closure of the embedding $y \mapsto \mathcal K_{o,r}( \cdot, y)$ is called the $r$-Martin compactification.

=== Martin boundary of a Riemannian manifold ===
For a Riemannian manifold the Martin boundary is constructed, when it exists, in the same way as above, using the Green function of the Laplace–Beltrami operator $\Delta$. In this case there is again a whole family of Martin compactifications associated to the operators $\Delta + \lambda$ for $0\le \lambda \le \lambda_0$ where $\lambda_0$ is the bottom of the spectrum. Examples where this construction can be used to define a compactification are bounded domains in the plane and symmetric spaces of non-compact type.

=== The relationship between Martin and Poisson boundaries ===
The measure $\nu_{o, 1}$ corresponding to the constant function is called the harmonic measure on the Martin boundary. With this measure the Martin boundary is isomorphic to the Poisson boundary.

== Examples ==
=== Nilpotent groups ===
The Poisson and Martin boundaries are trivial for symmetric random walks on nilpotent groups. On the other hand, when the random walk is non-centered, the study of the full Martin boundary, including the minimal functions, is far less conclusive.

=== Lie groups and discrete subgroups ===
For random walks on a semisimple Lie group (with step distribution absolutely continuous with respect to the Haar measure) the Poisson boundary is equal to the Furstenberg boundary. The Poisson boundary of the Brownian motion on the associated symmetric space is also the Furstenberg boundary. The full Martin boundary is also well-studied in these cases and can always be described in a geometric manner. For example, for groups of rank one (for example the isometry groups of hyperbolic spaces) the full Martin boundary is the same as the minimal Martin boundary (the situation in higher-rank groups is more complicated).

The Poisson boundary of a Zariski-dense subgroup of a semisimple Lie group, for example a lattice, is also equal to the Furstenberg boundary of the group.

=== Hyperbolic groups ===
For random walks on a hyperbolic group, under the finite entropy assumption on the step distribution which always hold for a simple walk (a more general condition is that the first moment be finite) the Poisson boundary is always equal to the Gromov boundary when equipped with the hitting probability measure. For example, the Poisson boundary of a free group is the space of ends of its Cayley tree. The identification of the full Martin boundary is more involved; in case the random walk has finite range (the step distribution is supported on a finite set) the Martin boundary coincides with the minimal Martin boundary and both coincide with the Gromov boundary.
