= Yuval Peres =

Israeli mathematician

Yuval Peres יובל פרס
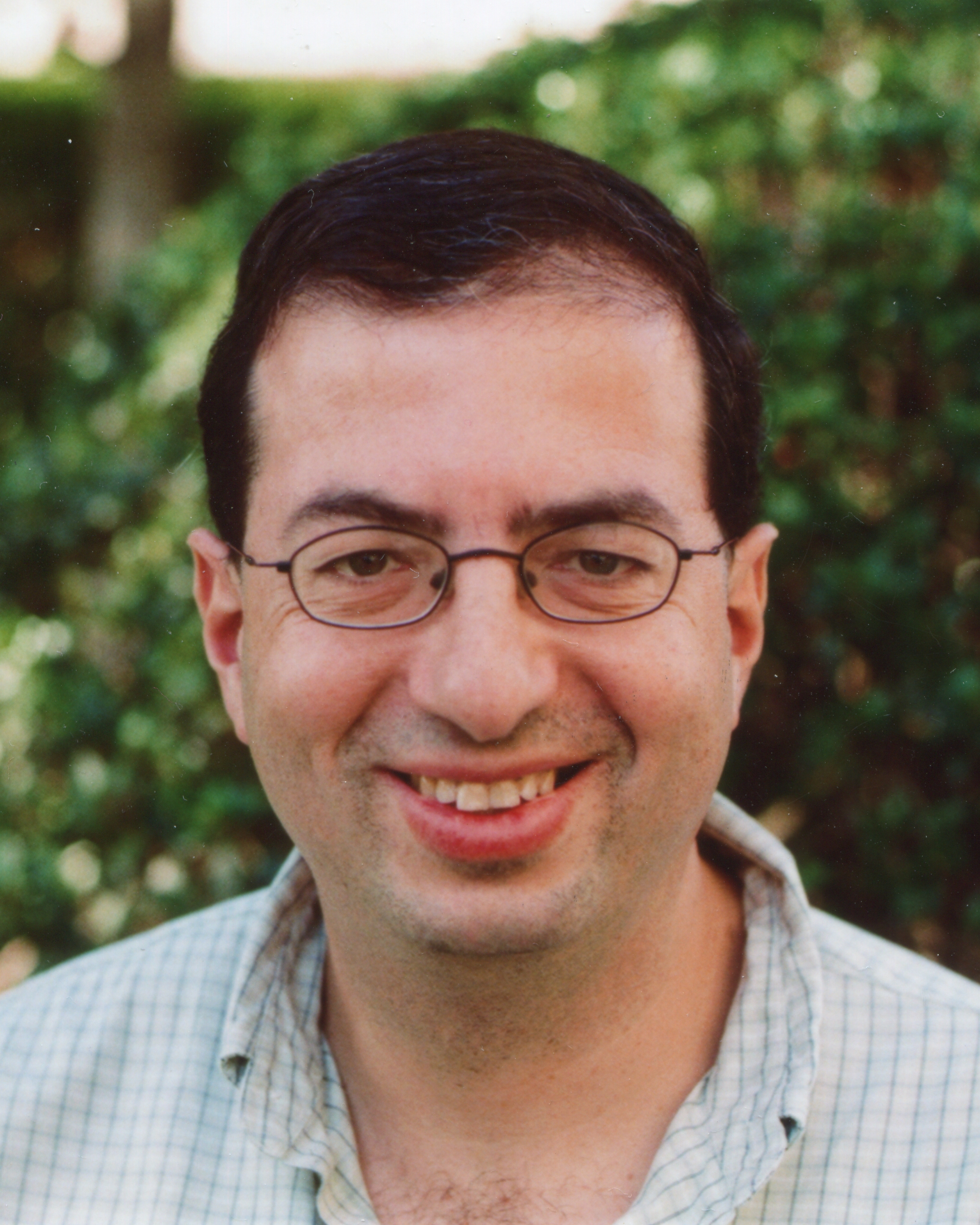
- Peres in 2005
- Born: 5 October 1963 (age 62); Jerusalem, Israel
- Education: Hebrew University of Jerusalem
- Awards: Loève Prize (2001); Davidson Prize (1995)
- Scientific career
- Fields: Mathematics
- Workplaces: Hebrew University of Jerusalem; University of California at Berkeley; Microsoft Research; BIMSA
- Doctoral advisor: Hillel Furstenberg

Yuval Peres (Hebrew: יובל פרס; born 5 October 1963) is an Israeli mathematician best known for his research in probability theory, ergodic theory, mathematical analysis, theoretical computer science, and in particular for topics such as fractals and Hausdorff measure, random walks, Brownian motion, percolation and Markov chain mixing times. Peres was accused of sexual harassment by several female scientists. He is now a professor at Beijing Institute of Mathematical Sciences and Applications.

== Education and career ==
Peres was born in Israel and obtained his Ph.D. at the Hebrew University of Jerusalem in 1990 under the supervision of Hillel Furstenberg. After his Ph.D. Peres had postdoctoral positions at Stanford and Yale. In 1993 Peres joined the statistics department at UC Berkeley. He later became a professor in both the mathematics and statistics departments. He was also a professor at the Hebrew University. In 2006 Peres joined the Theory Group of Microsoft Research. By 2011 he was principal researcher at Microsoft Research and manager of the Microsoft Research Theory Group, an affiliate professor of mathematics at the University of Washington and an adjunct professor at the University of California, Berkeley.

He stopped being a group manager in 2012, and left Microsoft Research in 2018. He was a researcher at Kent State University from 2020 to 2022. He became a professor at the Beijing Institute of Mathematical Sciences and Applications in China in 2022.

== Awards and recognition ==
Peres was awarded the Rollo Davidson Prize in 1995 and the Loève Prize in 2001. The work that led to the Loève Prize was surveyed in the Notices of the American Mathematical Society: "A key breakthrough was the observation that certain (hard to prove) intersection properties for Brownian motion and random walks are in fact equivalent to (easier to prove) survival properties of branching processes. This led ultimately to deep work on sample path properties of Brownian motion; for instance, on the fractal dimension of the frontier of two-dimensional Brownian motion and precise study of its thick and thin points and cover times."

Peres was an invited speaker at the International Congress of Mathematicians in 2002. In 2011, he was a co-recipient of the David P. Robbins Prize for work on the maximum overhang problem. That year he also delivered the Paul Turán Memorial Lecture. In 2012 he became a fellow of the American Mathematical Society. In 2016, he was elected a foreign associate of the National Academy of Sciences. In July 2017, he was a plenary lecturer at the Mathematical Congress of the Americas.

== Allegations of sexual harassment ==
Peres was accused of sexual harassment by several female scientists, including Dana Moshkovitz, Anima Anandkumar and Lisha Li. Moshkovitz said she was harassed by Peres on an informal job interview and she reported this to the Microsoft Theory Group. She also said that Peres was promoted shortly after her report. Peres resigned from an affiliate position at the University of Washington in 2012. The university said he resigned after receiving notice that the allegations of sexual harassment would be investigated.

In November 2018 three Israeli computer scientists Irit Dinur, Oded Goldreich and Ehud Friedgut wrote a letter to the community mentioning some allegations of sexual harassment against Peres and proposed a guideline of not making invitations to junior researchers that may be viewed as intimate. In response Peres wrote a letter to the community and said "I regret all cases in the past where I have not followed this principle. I had no intention to harass anyone but must have been tone deaf not to recognize that I was making some people very uncomfortable. As I wrote above, I promise to adhere to this principle in the future."

== Published works ==
- Levin, David A.; Peres, Yuval; Wilmer, Elizabeth L. (2009). Markov Chains and Mixing Times. Providence, Rhode Island: American Mathematical Society. ISBN 978-0-8218-4739-8. 2nd ed., 2017.
- Hough, J. Ben; Krishnapur, Manjunath; Peres, Yuval; Virág, Bálint (2009). Zeros of Gaussian Analytic Functions and Determinantal Processes. Providence, Rhode Island: American Mathematical Society.
- Mörters, Peter; Peres, Yuval (2010). Brownian Motion. Cambridge University Press.
- Lyons, Russell; Peres, Yuval (2016). Probability on Trees and Networks. Cambridge University Press.
- Bishop, Christopher J.; Peres, Yuval (2017). Fractals in Probability and Analysis. Cambridge University Press.
- Karlin, Anna; Peres, Yuval (2017). Game Theory, Alive. Providence, Rhode Island: American Mathematical Society.
