= Ramler =

Ramler is a surname of German origin. Notable people with the surname include:

- Karl Wilhelm Ramler (1725–1798), German poet
- Lexy Ramler (born 1999), American artistic gymnast
- Saly Ruth Ramler (1894–1993), Czech mathematician
