= Hyperbolic space =

Non-Euclidean geometry

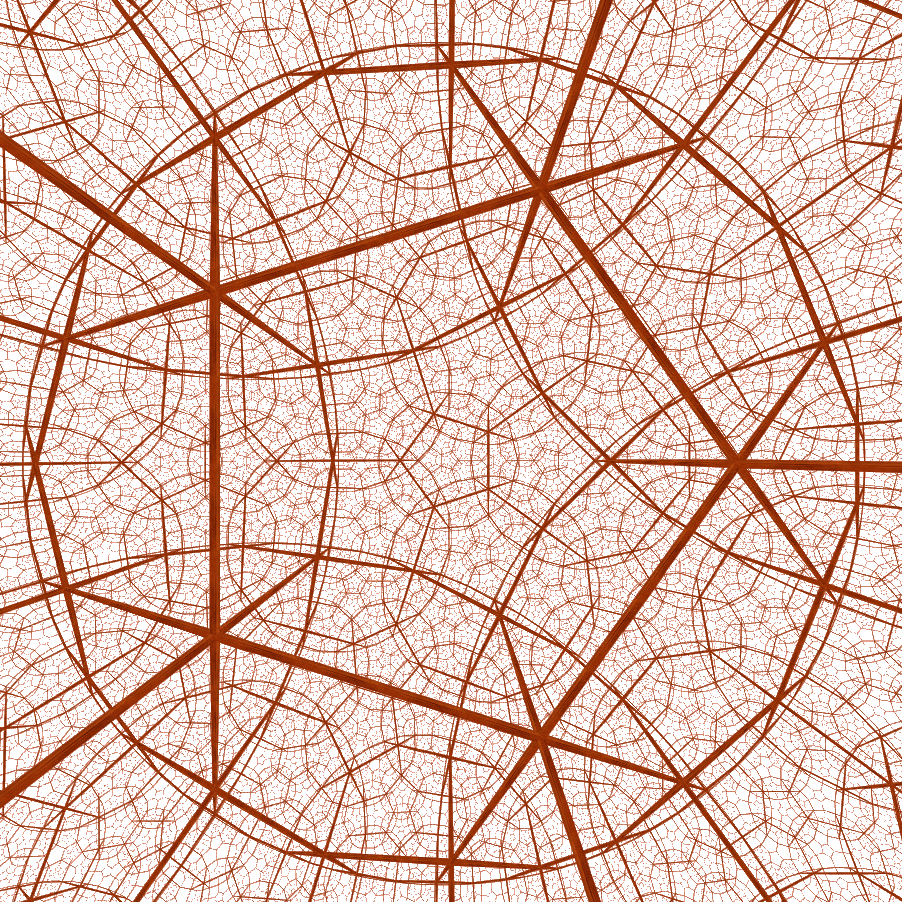
A perspective projection of a dodecahedral tessellation in H^{3}. Four dodecahedra meet at each edge, and eight meet at each vertex, like the cubes of a cubic tessellation in E^{3}

In mathematics, hyperbolic space of dimension n is the unique simply connected, n-dimensional Riemannian manifold of constant negative sectional curvature, often taken to be −1 for simplicity. It is homogeneous, and satisfies the stronger property of being a symmetric space. There are many ways to construct it as an open subset of $\mathbb R^n$ with an explicitly written Riemannian metric; such constructions are referred to as models. Hyperbolic 2-space, H^{2}, which was the first instance studied, is also called the hyperbolic plane.

It is also sometimes referred to as Lobachevsky space or Bolyai–Lobachevsky space after the names of the author who first published on the topic of hyperbolic geometry. Sometimes the qualificative "real" is added to distinguish it from complex hyperbolic spaces.

Hyperbolic space serves as the prototype of a Gromov hyperbolic space, which is a far-reaching notion including differential-geometric as well as more combinatorial spaces via a synthetic approach to negative curvature. Another generalisation is the notion of a CAT(−1) space.

== Formal definition and models ==
=== Definition ===
The $n$-dimensional hyperbolic space or hyperbolic $n$-space, usually denoted $\mathbb H^n$, is the unique simply connected, $n$-dimensional complete Riemannian manifold with a constant negative sectional curvature equal to −1. The unicity means that any two Riemannian manifolds that satisfy these properties are isometric to each other. It is a consequence of the Killing–Hopf theorem.

=== Models of hyperbolic space ===
To prove the existence of such a space as described above one can explicitly construct it, for example as an open subset of $\mathbb R^n$ with a Riemannian metric given by a simple formula. There are many such constructions or models of hyperbolic space, each suited to different aspects of its study. They are isometric to each other according to the previous paragraph, and in each case an explicit isometry can be explicitly given. Here is a list of the better-known models which are described in more detail in their namesake articles:

- Poincaré half-space model: this is the upper-half space $\{(x_1, \ldots, x_n) \in \mathbb R^n : x_n > 0\}$ with the metric $\tfrac{dx_1^2+\cdots + dx_n^2}{x_n^2}$
- Poincaré disc model: this is the unit ball of $\mathbb R^n$ with the metric $4\tfrac{dx_1^2+\cdots + dx_n^2}{(1 - (x_1^2 + \cdots + x_n^2))^2}$. The isometry to the half-space model can be realised by a homography sending a point of the unit sphere to infinity.
- Hyperboloid model: In contrast with the previous two models this realises hyperbolic $n$-space as isometrically embedded inside the $(n+1)$-dimensional Minkowski space (which is not a Riemannian but rather a Lorentzian manifold). More precisely, looking at the quadratic form $q(x) = x_1^2 + \cdots + x_n^2 - x_{n+1}^2$ on $\mathbb R^{n+1}$, its restriction to the tangent spaces of the upper sheet of the hyperboloid given by $q(x) = -1$ are definite positive, hence they endow it with a Riemannian metric that turns out to be of constant curvature −1. The isometry to the previous models can be realised by stereographic projection from the hyperboloid to the plane $\{x_{n+1} = 0\}$, taking the vertex from which to project to be $(0, \ldots, 0, 1)$ for the ball and a point at infinity in the cone $q(x)=0$ inside projective space for the half-space.
- Beltrami–Klein model: This is another model realised on the unit ball of $\mathbb R^n$; rather than being given as an explicit metric it is usually presented as obtained by using stereographic projection from the hyperboloid model in Minkowski space to its horizontal tangent plane (that is, $x_{n+1}=1$) from the origin $(0, \ldots, 0)$.
- Symmetric space: Hyperbolic $n$-space can be realised as the symmetric space of the simple Lie group $\mathrm{SO}(n, 1)$ (the group of isometries of the quadratic form $q$ with positive determinant); as a set the latter is the coset space $\mathrm{SO}(n, 1)/\mathrm{O}(n)$. The isometry to the hyperboloid model is immediate through the action of the connected component of $\mathrm{SO}(n, 1)$ on the hyperboloid.

== Geometric properties ==
=== Parallel lines ===
Hyperbolic space, developed independently by Nikolai Lobachevsky, János Bolyai and Carl Friedrich Gauss, is a geometric space analogous to Euclidean space, but such that Euclid's parallel postulate is no longer assumed to hold. Instead, the parallel postulate is replaced by the following alternative (in two dimensions):

- Given any line L and point P not on L, there are at least two distinct lines passing through P that do not intersect L.

It is then a theorem that there are infinitely many such lines through P. This axiom still does not uniquely characterize the hyperbolic plane up to isometry; there is an extra constant, the curvature K < 0, that must be specified. However, it does uniquely characterize it up to homothety, meaning up to bijections that only change the notion of distance by an overall constant. By choosing an appropriate length scale, one can thus assume, without loss of generality, that K = −1.

=== Euclidean embeddings ===
The hyperbolic plane cannot be isometrically embedded into Euclidean 3-space by Hilbert's theorem. On the other hand the Nash embedding theorem implies that hyperbolic n-space can be isometrically embedded into some Euclidean space of larger dimension (5 for the hyperbolic plane by the Nash embedding theorem).

When isometrically embedded to a Euclidean space every point of a hyperbolic space is a saddle point.

=== Volume growth and isoperimetric inequality ===
The volume of balls in hyperbolic space increases exponentially with respect to the radius of the ball rather than polynomially as in Euclidean space. Namely, if $B(r)$ is any ball of radius $r$ in $\mathbb H^n$ then:
$$\mathrm{Vol}(B(r)) = \mathrm{Vol}(S^{n-1}) \int_0^r \sinh^{n-1}(t) dt$$
where $S^{n-1}$ is the total volume of the Euclidean $(n-1)$-sphere of radius 1.

The hyperbolic space also satisfies a linear isoperimetric inequality, that is there exists a constant $i$ such that any embedded disk whose boundary has length $r$ has area at most $i \cdot r$. This is to be contrasted with Euclidean space where the isoperimetric inequality is quadratic.

=== Other metric properties ===
There are many more metric properties of hyperbolic space that differentiate it from Euclidean space. Some can be generalised to the setting of Gromov-hyperbolic spaces, which is a generalisation of the notion of negative curvature to general metric spaces using only the large-scale properties. A finer notion is that of a CAT(−1)-space.

== Hyperbolic manifolds ==
Every complete, connected, simply connected manifold of constant negative curvature −1 is isometric to the real hyperbolic space H^{n}. As a result, the universal cover of any closed manifold M of constant negative curvature −1, which is to say, a hyperbolic manifold, is H^{n}. Thus, every such M can be written as H^{n}/Γ, where Γ is a torsion-free discrete group of isometries on H^{n}. That is, Γ is a lattice in SO^{+}(n, 1).

=== Riemann surfaces ===
Two-dimensional hyperbolic surfaces can also be understood according to the language of Riemann surfaces. According to the uniformization theorem, every Riemann surface is either elliptic, parabolic or hyperbolic. Most hyperbolic surfaces have a non-trivial fundamental group π_{1} = Γ; the groups that arise this way are known as Fuchsian groups. The quotient space H^{2}/Γ of the upper half-plane modulo the fundamental group is known as the Fuchsian model of the hyperbolic surface. The Poincaré half plane is also hyperbolic, but is simply connected and noncompact. It is the universal cover of the other hyperbolic surfaces.

The analogous construction for three-dimensional hyperbolic surfaces is the Kleinian model.

== See also ==
- Dini's surface
- Hyperbolic 3-manifold
- Ideal polyhedron
- Mostow rigidity theorem
- Murakami–Yano formula
- Pseudosphere
