= Poincaré model =

Poincaré model can refer to:

- Poincaré disk model, a model of n-dimensional hyperbolic geometry
- Poincaré half-plane model, a model of two-dimensional hyperbolic geometry
