= Furstenberg's proof of the infinitude of primes =

Proof of the infinitude of primes

In mathematics, particularly in number theory, Hillel Furstenberg's proof of the infinitude of primes is a topological proof that the integers contain infinitely many prime numbers. When examined closely, the proof is less a statement about topology than a statement about certain properties of arithmetic sequences. Unlike Euclid's classical proof, Furstenberg's proof is a proof by contradiction. The proof was published in 1955 in the American Mathematical Monthly while he was still an undergraduate student at Yeshiva University.

== Furstenberg's proof ==
Define a topology on the integers $\mathbb{Z}$, called the evenly spaced integer topology, by declaring a subset U ⊆ $\mathbb{Z}$ to be an open set if and only if it is a union of arithmetic sequences S(a, b) for a ≠ 0, or is empty (which can be seen as a nullary union (empty union) of arithmetic sequences), where

$$S(a, b) = \{ a n  + b \mid n \in \mathbb{Z} \} = a \mathbb{Z} + b.$$

Equivalently, U is open if and only if for every x in U there is some non-zero integer a such that S(a, x) ⊆ U. The axioms for a topology are easily verified:

- ∅ is open by definition, and $\mathbb{Z}$ is just the sequence S(1, 0), and so is open as well.
- Any union of open sets is open: an open set is the union of arithmetic sequences, and a union of unions of arithmetic sequences is itself a union of arithmetic sequences.
- The intersection of two (and hence finitely many) open sets is open: let U_{1} and U_{2} be open sets and let x ∈ U_{1} ∩ U_{2} (with numbers a_{1} and a_{2} establishing membership). Set a to be the least common multiple of a_{1} and a_{2}. Then S(a, x) ⊆ S(a_{i}, x) ⊆ U_{i}.

This topology has two notable properties:

1. Since any non-empty open set contains an infinite sequence, a finite non-empty set cannot be open; put another way, the complement of a finite non-empty set cannot be a closed set.
2. The basis sets S(a, b) are both open and closed: they are open by definition, and we can write S(a, b) as the complement of an open set as follows:

$$S(a, b) = \mathbb{Z} \setminus \bigcup_{j = 1}^{a - 1} S(a, b + j).$$

The only integers that are not integer multiples of prime numbers are −1 and +1, i.e.

$$\mathbb{Z} \setminus \{ -1, + 1 \} = \bigcup_{p \mathrm{\, prime}} S(p, 0).$$

Now, by the first topological property, the set on the left-hand side cannot be closed. On the other hand, by the second topological property, the sets S(p, 0) are closed. So, if there were only finitely many prime numbers, then the set on the right-hand side would be a finite union of closed sets, and hence closed. This would be a contradiction, so there must be infinitely many prime numbers.

== Topological properties ==
The evenly spaced integer topology on $\Z$ is the topology induced by the inclusion $\Z\subset \hat\Z$, where $\hat\Z$ is the profinite integer ring with its profinite topology.

It is homeomorphic to the rational numbers $\mathbb{Q}$ with the subspace topology inherited from the real line, which makes it clear that any finite subset of it, such as $\{-1, +1\}$, cannot be open.
