= Poincaré half-plane model =

Upper-half plane model of hyperbolic non-Euclidean geometry

Parallel rays in Poincare half-plane model of hyperbolic geometry

In non-Euclidean geometry, the Poincaré half-plane model is a way of representing the hyperbolic plane using points in the familiar Euclidean plane. Specifically, each point in the hyperbolic plane is represented using a Euclidean point with coordinates $\langle x, y\rangle$ whose $y$ coordinate is greater than zero, the upper half-plane, and a metric tensor (definition of distance) called the Poincaré metric is adopted, in which the local scale is inversely proportional to the $y$ coordinate. Points on the $x$-axis, whose $y$ coordinate is equal to zero, represent ideal points (points at infinity), which are outside the hyperbolic plane proper.

Sometimes the points of the half-plane model are considered to lie in the complex plane with positive imaginary part. Using this interpretation, each point in the hyperbolic plane is associated with a complex number.

The half-plane model can be thought of as a map projection from the curved hyperbolic plane to the flat Euclidean plane. From the hyperboloid model (a representation of the hyperbolic plane on a hyperboloid of two sheets embedded in 3-dimensional Minkowski space, analogous to the sphere embedded in 3-dimensional Euclidean space), the half-plane model is obtained by orthographic projection in a direction parallel to a null vector, which can also be thought of as a kind of stereographic projection centered on an ideal point. The projection is conformal, meaning that it preserves angles, and like the stereographic projection of the sphere it projects generalized circles (geodesics, hypercycles, horocycles, and circles) in the hyperbolic plane to generalized circles (lines or circles) in the plane. In particular, geodesics (analogous to straight lines), project to either half-circles whose center has $y$ coordinate zero, or to vertical straight lines of constant $x$ coordinate, hypercycles project to circles crossing the $x$-axis, horocycles project to either circles tangent to the $x$-axis or to horizontal lines of constant $y$ coordinate, and circles project to circles contained entirely in the half-plane.

Hyperbolic motions, the distance-preserving geometric transformations from the hyperbolic plane to itself, are represented in the Poincaré half-plane by the subset of Möbius transformations of the plane which preserve the half-plane; these are conformal, circle-preserving transformations which send the $x$-axis to itself without changing its orientation. When points in the plane are taken to be complex numbers, any Möbius transformation is represented by a linear fractional transformation of complex numbers, and the hyperbolic motions are represented by elements of the projective special linear group $\operatorname{PSL}_2(\R)$.

The Cayley transform provides an isometry between the half-plane model and the Poincaré disk model, which is a stereographic projection of the hyperboloid centered on any ordinary point in the hyperbolic plane, which maps the hyperbolic plane onto a disk in the Euclidean plane, and also shares the properties of conformality and mapping generalized circles to generalized circles.

The Poincaré half-plane model is named after Henri Poincaré, but it originated with Eugenio Beltrami who used it, along with the Klein model and the Poincaré disk model, to show that hyperbolic geometry was equiconsistent with Euclidean geometry.

The half-plane model can be generalized to the Poincaré half-space model of $(n+1)$-dimensional hyperbolic space by replacing the single $x$ coordinate by $n$ distinct coordinates.

== Metric ==
The metric of the model on the half-plane, $\{ \langle x, y \rangle \mid y > 0 \},$ is:

$$(d s)^2 = \frac{(d x)^2 + (d y)^2}{y^2}$$

where s measures the length along a (possibly curved) line. The straight lines in the hyperbolic plane (geodesics for this metric tensor, i.e., curves which minimize the distance) are represented in this model by circular arcs perpendicular to the x-axis (half-circles whose centers are on the x-axis) and straight vertical rays perpendicular to the x-axis.

=== Distance calculation ===
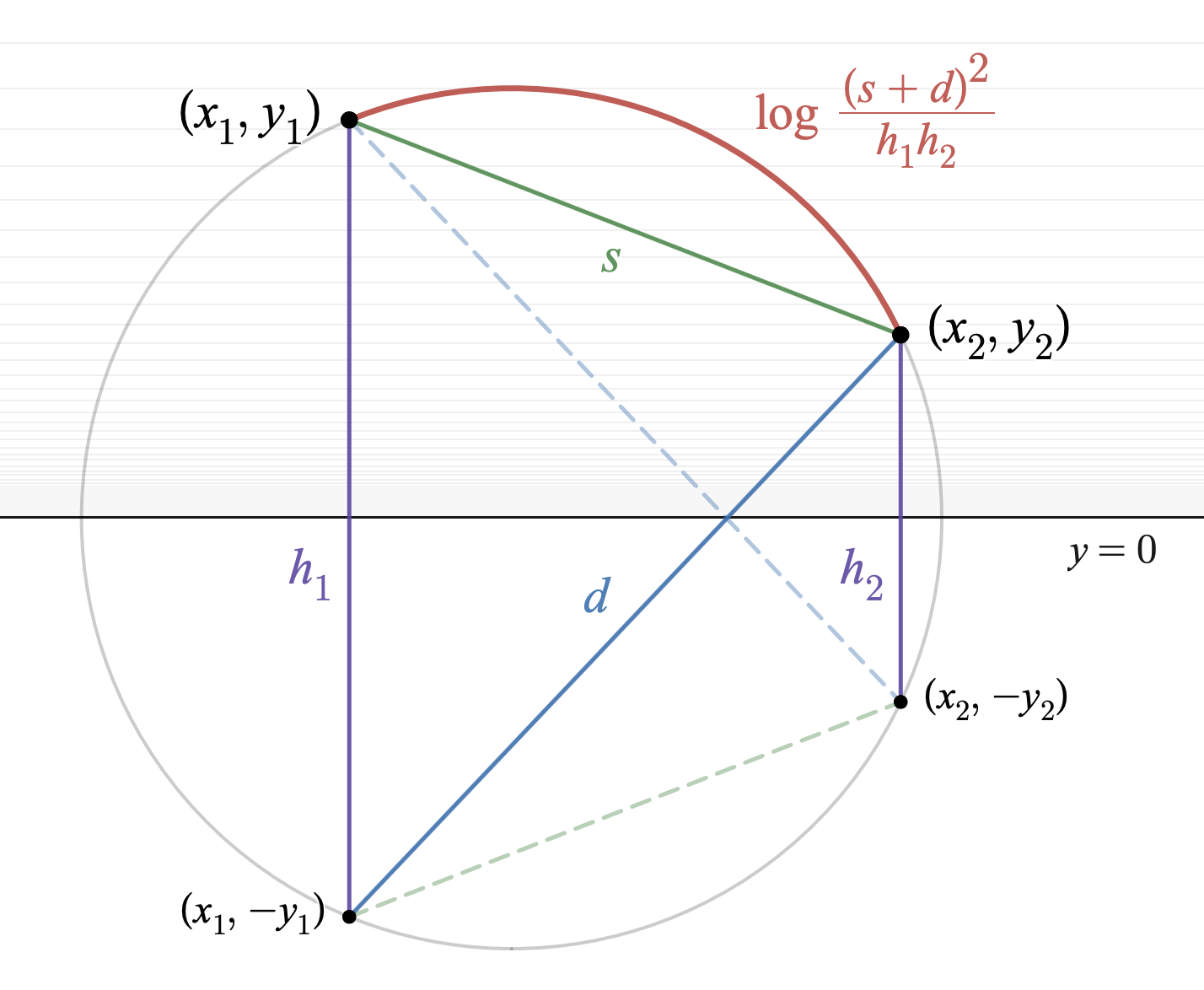
The distance between two points in the half-plane model can be computed in terms of Euclidean distances in an isosceles trapezoid formed by the points and their reflection across the x-axis: a "side length" s, a "diagonal" d, and two "heights" h_{1} and h_{2}. It is the logarithm dist(p_{1}, p_{2}) = log((s + d)^{2}/h_{1}h_{2})

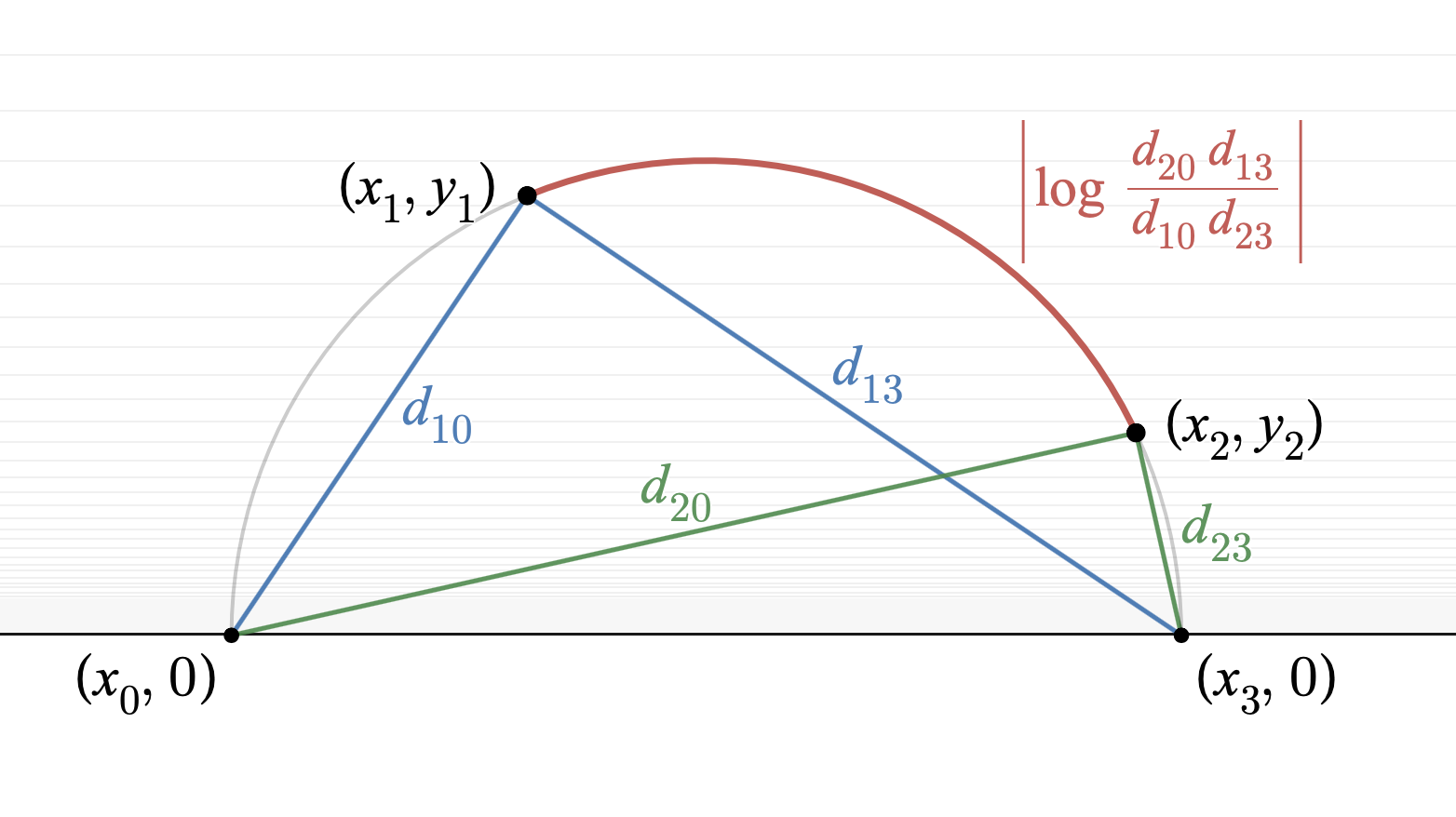
Distance between two points can alternately be computed using ratios of Euclidean distances to the ideal points at the ends of the hyperbolic line.

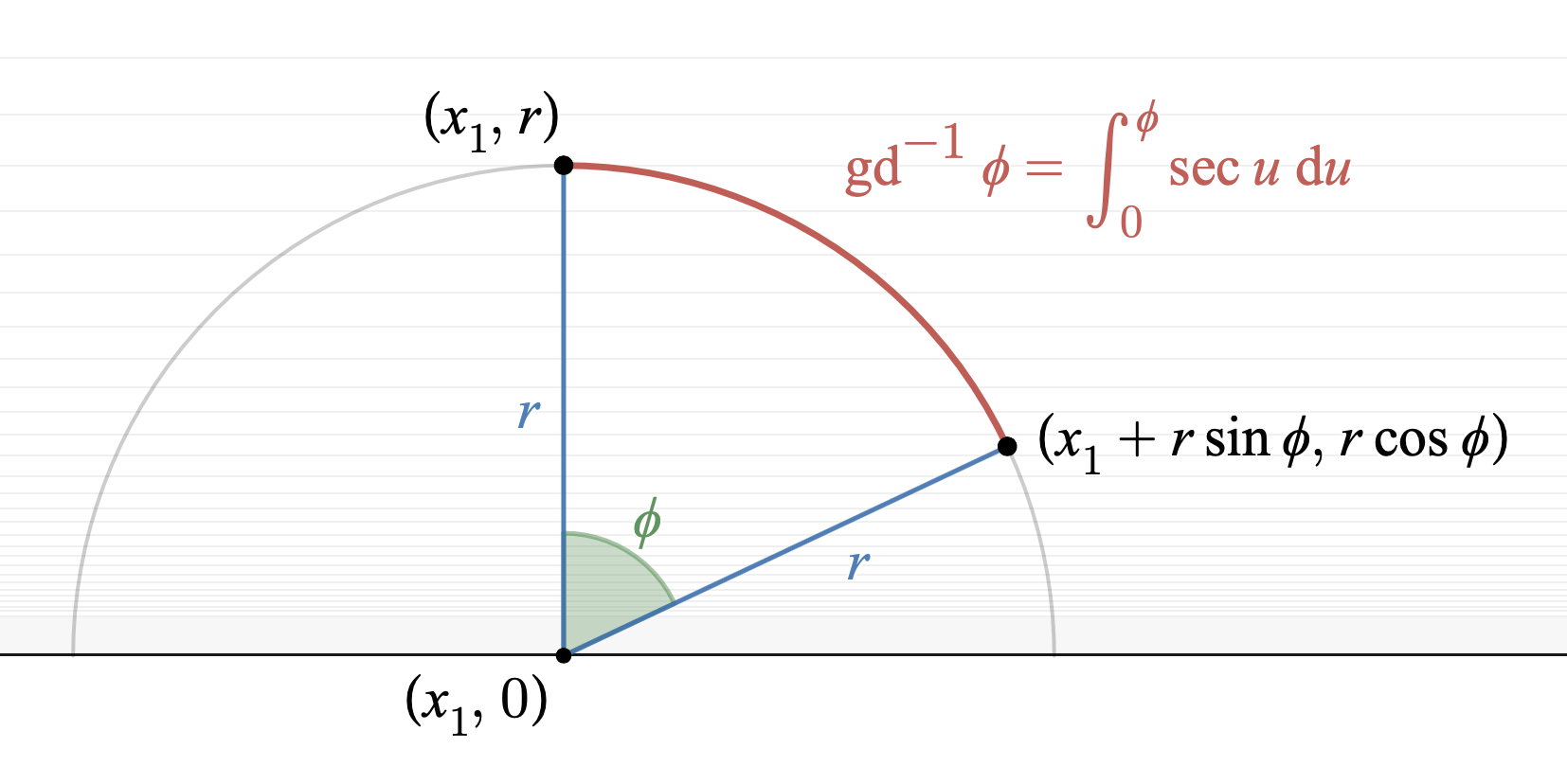
Distance from the apex of a semicircle to another point on it is the inverse Gudermannian function of the central angle.

If $p_1 = \langle x_1, y_1 \rangle$ and $p_2 = \langle x_2, y_2 \rangle$ are two points in the half-plane $y > 0$ and $\tilde p_1 = \langle x_1, -y_1 \rangle$ is the reflection of $p_1$ across the x-axis into the lower half plane, the distance between the two points under the hyperbolic-plane metric is:

$$\begin{align}
\operatorname{dist} (p_1, p_2)
&= 2\operatorname{arsinh} \frac{ \| p_2 - p_1 \| } {2 \sqrt{y_1 y_2 \vphantom t} } \\[10mu]
&= 2\operatorname{artanh} \frac{ \| p_2 - p_1 \| } { \| p_2 - \tilde p_1 \| } \\[10mu]
&= 2\ln \frac{\| p_2 - p_1 \| + \| p_2 - \tilde p_1 \|} { 2 \sqrt{y_1 y_2 \vphantom t}},
\end{align}$$

where $\|p_2 - p_1\| = \sqrt{(x_2 - x_1)^2 + (y_2 - y_1)^2}$ is the Euclidean distance between points $p_1$ and $p_2$, $\vphantom\Big) \operatorname{arsinh}x = {}$$\textstyle \ln \bigl(x + \sqrt{x^2 + 1} \bigr)$ is the inverse hyperbolic sine, and $\operatorname{artanh} x \vphantom\big) = {}$$\tfrac12\ln\bigl((1+x)/(1-x)\bigr)$ is the inverse hyperbolic tangent. This $2\operatorname{arsinh}$ formula can be thought of as coming from the chord length in the Minkowski metric between points in the hyperboloid model, $\operatorname{chord}(p_1,\, p_2) = {} \vphantom{\tfrac12}$$2\sinh \tfrac12 \operatorname{dist} (p_1,\, p_2)$, analogous to finding arclength on a sphere in terms of chord length. This $2\operatorname{artanh}$ formula can be thought of as coming from Euclidean distance in the Poincaré disk model with one point at the origin, analogous to finding arclength on the sphere by taking a stereographic projection centered on one point and measuring the Euclidean distance in the plane from the origin to the other point.

If the two points $p_1$ and $p_2$ are on a hyperbolic line (Euclidean half-circle) which intersects the x-axis at the ideal points $p_0 = \langle x_0, 0 \rangle$ and $p_3 = \langle x_3, 0 \rangle,$ the distance from $p_1$ to $p_2$ is:

$$\operatorname{dist}(p_1, p_2) = \left|\, \ln \frac{\|p_2 - p_0\| \|p_1 - p_3\|}{ \|p_1 - p_0\| \|p_2 - p_3\|} \right|.$$

Cf. Cross-ratio.

Some special cases can be simplified. Two points with the same $x$ coordinate:

$${\operatorname{dist}} \bigl(\langle x, y_1 \rangle, \langle x, y_2 \rangle \bigr) =\left|\, \ln\frac{y_2}{y_1} \right| = | \ln y_2 - \ln y_1 |.$$

Two points with the same $y$ coordinate:

$${\operatorname{dist}} \bigl( \langle x_1,\, y \rangle, \langle x_2,\, y \rangle \bigr)
= 2 \operatorname{arsinh} \frac{|x_2 -x_1|}{2 y}.$$

One point $\langle x_1, r \rangle$ at the apex of the semicircle $(x - x_1)^2 + y^2 = r^2,$ and another point at a central angle of $\phi$.

$${\operatorname{dist}} \bigl( \langle x_1, r \rangle, \langle x_1 \pm r\sin\phi, r\cos\phi \rangle \bigr)
= {2\operatorname{artanh}}\bigl({\tan\tfrac12 \phi} \bigr)
= \operatorname{gd}^{-1} \phi,$$

where $\textstyle \operatorname{gd}^{-1}$ is the inverse Gudermannian function.

== Special points and curves ==
Ideal points (points at infinity) in the Poincaré half-plane model are of two kinds: the points on the $x$-axis, and one imaginary point at $y = \infty$ which is the ideal point to which all lines orthogonal to the $x$-axis converge.

Straight lines, geodesics (the shortest path between the points contained within it) are modeled by either Euclidean half-circles whose origin is on the x-axis, or straight Euclidean vertical rays orthogonal to the x-axis.

A circle (curve equidistant from a central point) with center $\langle x, y \rangle$ and radius $r$ is modeled by a Euclidean circle with center $\langle x, y \cosh r \rangle$ and radius $y \sinh r$.

A hypercycle (a curve equidistant from a straight line, its axis) is modeled by either a circular arc which intersects the $x$-axis at the same two ideal points as the half-circle which models its axis but at an acute or obtuse angle, or a straight line which intersects the $x$-axis at the same point as the vertical line which models its axis, but at an acute or obtuse angle.

A horocycle (a curve whose normals all converge asymptotically in the same direction, its center) is modeled by either a circle tangent to the $x$-axis (but excluding the ideal point of intersection, which is its center), or a line parallel to the $x$-axis, in which case the center is the ideal point at $y = \infty$.

=== Euclidean synopsis ===
A Euclidean circle with center $\langle x_e, y_e \rangle$ and radius $r_e$ represents:

- when the circle is completely inside the halfplane a hyperbolic circle with center
  $$\textstyle \big\langle x_e, \sqrt{y_e^2 - r_e^2 }\, \big\rangle$$
  and radius
  $$\tfrac12 \ln \left( \frac{y_e + r_e} {y_e - r_e} \right).$$
- when the circle is completely inside the halfplane and touches the boundary a horocycle centered around the ideal point $(x_e, 0 )$
- when the circle intersects the boundary orthogonal $( y_e = 0 )$ a hyperbolic line
- when the circle intersects the boundary non- orthogonal a hypercycle.

== Compass and straightedge constructions ==
Here is how one can use compass and straightedge constructions in the model to achieve the effect of the basic constructions in the hyperbolic plane. For example, how to construct the half-circle in the Euclidean half-plane which models a line on the hyperbolic plane through two given points.

=== Creating the line through two existing points ===
Draw the line segment between the two points. Construct the perpendicular bisector of the line segment. Find its intersection with the x-axis. Draw the circle around the intersection which passes through the given points. Erase the part which is on or below the x-axis.

Or in the special case where the two given points lie on a vertical line, draw that vertical line through the two points and erase the part which is on or below the x-axis.

=== Creating the circle through one point with center another point ===
If the two points are not on a vertical line: Draw the radial line (half-circle) between the two given points as in the previous case. Construct a tangent to that line at the non-central point. Drop a perpendicular from the given center point to the x-axis. Find the intersection of these two lines to get the center of the model circle. Draw the model circle around that new center and passing through the given non-central point.

If the two given points lie on a vertical line and the given center is above the other given point: Draw a circle around the intersection of the vertical line and the x-axis which passes through the given central point. Draw a horizontal line through the non-central point. Construct the tangent to the circle at its intersection with that horizontal line. The midpoint between the intersection of the tangent with the vertical line and the given non-central point is the center of the model circle. Draw the model circle around that new center and passing through the given non-central point.

If the two given points lie on a vertical line and the given center is below the other given point: Draw a circle around the intersection of the vertical line and the x-axis which passes through the given central point. Draw a line tangent to the circle which passes through the given non-central point. Draw a horizontal line through that point of tangency and find its intersection with the vertical line. The midpoint between that intersection and the given non-central point is the center of the model circle. Draw the model circle around that new center and passing through the given non-central point.

=== Given a circle find its (hyperbolic) center ===
Drop a perpendicular p from the Euclidean center of the circle to the x-axis. Let point q be the intersection of this line and the x- axis. Draw a line tangent to the circle going through q. Draw the half circle h with center q going through the point where the tangent and the circle meet. The (hyperbolic) center is the point where h and p intersect.

=== Other constructions ===
Creating the point which is the intersection of two existing lines, if they intersect: Find the intersection of the two given semicircles (or vertical lines).

Creating the one or two points in the intersection of a line and a circle (if they intersect): Find the intersection of the given semicircle (or vertical line) with the given circle.

Creating the one or two points in the intersection of two circles (if they intersect): Find the intersection of the two given circles.

== Symmetry groups ==
Stellated regular heptagonal tiling of the model

The projective linear group PGL(2,C) acts on the Riemann sphere by the Möbius transformations. The subgroup that maps the upper half-plane, H, onto itself is PSL(2,R), the transforms with real coefficients, and these act transitively and isometrically on the upper half-plane, making it a homogeneous space.

There are four closely related Lie groups that act on the upper half-plane by fractional linear transformations and preserve the hyperbolic distance.

- The special linear group SL(2,R) which consists of the set of 2×2 matrices with real entries whose determinant equals +1. Note that many texts (including Wikipedia) often say SL(2,R) when they really mean PSL(2,R).
- The group S*L(2,R) consisting of the set of 2×2 matrices with real entries whose determinant equals +1 or −1. Note that SL(2,R) is a subgroup of this group.
- The projective special linear group PSL(2,R) = SL(2,R)/{±I}, consisting of the matrices in SL(2,R) modulo plus or minus the identity matrix.
- The group PS^{*}L(2,R) = S^{*}L(2,R)/{±I}=PGL(2,R) is again a projective group, and again, modulo plus or minus the identity matrix. PSL(2,R) is contained as an index-two normal subgroup, the other coset being the set of 2×2 matrices with real entries whose determinant equals −1, modulo plus or minus the identity.

The relationship of these groups to the Poincaré model is as follows:

- The group of all isometries of H, sometimes denoted as Isom(H), is isomorphic to PS^{*}L(2,R). This includes both the orientation preserving and the orientation-reversing isometries. The orientation-reversing map (the mirror map) is $z\rightarrow -\overline{z}$.
- The group of orientation-preserving isometries of H, sometimes denoted as Isom^{+}(H), is isomorphic to PSL(2,R).

Important subgroups of the isometry group are the Fuchsian groups.

One also frequently sees the modular group SL(2,Z). This group is important in two ways. First, it is a symmetry group of the square 2x2 lattice of points. Thus, functions that are periodic on a square grid, such as modular forms and elliptic functions, will thus inherit an SL(2,Z) symmetry from the grid. Second, SL(2,Z) is of course a subgroup of SL(2,R), and thus has a hyperbolic behavior embedded in it. In particular, SL(2,Z) can be used to tessellate the hyperbolic plane into cells of equal (Poincaré) area.

== Isometric symmetry ==
The group action of the projective special linear group ${\rm PSL}(2,\R)$ on $\mathbb{H}$ is defined by

$$\begin{pmatrix}a&b\\ c&d\\ \end{pmatrix} \cdot z = \frac{az+b}{cz+d} = \frac{(ac|z|^2+bd+(ad+bc)\Re(z)) + i(ad-bc)\Im(z)}{|cz+d|^2}.$$

Note that the action is transitive: for any $z_1,z_2\in\mathbb{H}$, there exists a $g\in {\rm PSL}(2,\R)$ such that $gz_1=z_2$. It is also faithful, in that if $gz=z$ for all $z\in\mathbb{H},$ then g = e.

The stabilizer or isotropy subgroup of an element $z\in\mathbb{H}$ is the set of $g\in{\rm PSL}(2,\R)$ which leave z unchanged: gz = z. The stabilizer of i is the rotation group

$${\rm SO}(2) = \left.\left\{ \begin{pmatrix}\cos\theta&\sin\theta\\ -\sin\theta&\cos\theta\\ \end{pmatrix}\right | \theta\in\R\right\}.$$

Since any element $z\in\mathbb{H}$ is mapped to i by some element of ${\rm PSL}(2, \R)$, this means that the isotropy subgroup of any z is isomorphic to SO(2). Thus, $\mathbb{H}={\rm PSL}(2,\R)/{\rm SO}(2)$. Alternatively, the bundle of unit-length tangent vectors on the upper half-plane, called the unit tangent bundle, is isomorphic to ${\rm PSL}(2, \R)$.

The upper half-plane is tessellated into free regular sets by the modular group ${\rm SL}(2, \Z).$

== Geodesics ==
The geodesics for this metric tensor are circular arcs perpendicular to the real axis (half-circles whose origin is on the real axis) and straight vertical lines ending on the real axis.

The unit-speed geodesic going up vertically, through the point i is given by

$$\gamma(t) = \begin{pmatrix}e^{t/2}&0\\ 0&e^{-t/2}\\ \end{pmatrix}\cdot i = ie^t.$$

Because PSL(2,R) acts transitively by isometries of the upper half-plane, this geodesic is mapped into the other geodesics through the action of PSL(2,R). Thus, the general unit-speed geodesic is given by

$$\gamma(t)=\begin{pmatrix}a&b\\ c&d\\ \end{pmatrix} \begin{pmatrix}e^{t/2}&0\\0&e^{-t/2}\\ \end{pmatrix}\cdot i = \frac {aie^t +b} {cie^t +d}.$$

This provides a basic description of the geodesic flow on the unit-length tangent bundle (complex line bundle) on the upper half-plane. Starting with this model, one can obtain the flow on arbitrary Riemann surfaces, as described in the article on the Anosov flow.

== The model in three dimensions ==
The metric of the model on the half- space $\{ \langle x, y, z \rangle \mid z > 0 \}$ is given by

$$(d s)^2 = \frac{(d x)^2 + (d y)^2 + (d z)^2}{z^2} \,$$

where s measures length along a possibly curved line. The straight lines in the hyperbolic space (geodesics for this metric tensor, i.e. curves which minimize the distance) are represented in this model by circular arcs normal to the z = 0-plane (half-circles whose origin is on the z = 0-plane) and straight vertical rays normal to the z = 0-plane.

The distance between two points $p_1 = \langle x_1, y_1,z_1 \rangle$ and $p_2 = \langle x_2, y_2, z_2 \rangle$ measured in this metric along such a geodesic is:

$$\operatorname{dist} (p_1, p_2) = 2 \operatorname{arsinh} \frac{ \| p_2 - p_1 \| }{ 2 \sqrt{z_1 z_2 \vphantom t} }.$$

== The model in n dimensions ==
This model can be generalized to model an $n+1$ dimensional hyperbolic space by replacing the real number x by a vector in an n dimensional Euclidean vector space.

== See also ==
- Angle of parallelism
- Anosov flow
- Fuchsian group
- Fuchsian model
- Hyperbolic motion
- Kleinian model
- Models of the hyperbolic plane
- Pseudosphere
- Schwarz–Ahlfors–Pick theorem
- Ultraparallel theorem
