= Christopher J. Bishop =

American mathematician

Christopher J. Bishop is an American mathematician on the faculty at Stony Brook University. He received his bachelor's in mathematics from Michigan State University in 1982, going on from there to spend a year at Cambridge University, receiving at Cambridge a Certificate of Advanced Study in mathematics, before entering the University of Chicago in 1983 for his doctoral studies in mathematics. As a graduate student in Chicago, his advisor, Peter Jones, took a position at Yale University, causing Bishop to spend the years 1985–87 at Yale as a visiting graduate student and programmer. Nonetheless, he received his PhD from the University of Chicago in 1987.

== Career ==
Upon receiving his PhD, Bishop went to MSRI in Berkeley from 1987–88. After that, he was the Henrik Assistant Professor at UCLA from 1988–91. In 1992 he joined, and remains on, the faculty of Stony Brook University, attaining the rank of full professor there in 1997.

== Research ==
Bishop is known for his contributions to geometric function theory, Kleinian groups, complex dynamics, and computational geometry; and in particular for topics such as fractals, harmonic measure, conformal and quasiconformal mappings and Julia sets. Along with Peter Jones, he is the namesake of the class of Bishop-Jones curves.

== Awards and honors ==
Bishop was awarded the 1992 A. P. Sloan Foundation fellowship. He was an invited speaker at the 2018 International Congress of Mathematicians. He was included in the 2019 class of fellows of the American Mathematical Society "for contributions to the theory of harmonic measures, quasiconformal maps and transcendental dynamics" and was a 2019 Simons Fellow in Mathematics. He is on the editorial board of the journal Annales Academiae Scientiarum Fennicae Mathematica as of July 1, 2021. In November 2021 he was appointed a Distinguished Professor at the State University of New York. In 2024, he received the Senior Berwick Prize of the London Mathematical Society.

== Books ==
- Bishop, Christopher J.; Peres, Yuval (2017). Fractals in probability and analysis. Cambridge University Press. doi:10.1017/9781316460238. ISBN 978-1-107-13411-9. OCLC 967417699.
