= Furstenberg boundary =

Notion of boundary associated with a group

In mathematics, specifically harmonic analysis and probability theory, the Furstenberg boundary is a notion of boundary associated with a group. It is named for Harry Furstenberg, who introduced it in a series of papers beginning in 1963 (in the case of semisimple Lie groups). The Furstenberg boundary can be characterized as a universal boundary space for harmonic analysis on the group, in the sense that bounded harmonic functions can be represented by their boundary values via a Poisson-type integral.

For example, when $G=\mathrm{SL}(2,\mathbb{R})$, the Furstenberg boundary is the real projective line $\mathbb{RP}^1$, which may be identified with the boundary circle of the hyperbolic plane, and the Poisson-like integral is the usual Poisson kernel for the upper half-plane.

== Semisimple Lie groups ==
Let $G$ be a connected semisimple Lie group. The Furstenberg boundary of $G$ is the homogeneous space

$$G/P,$$

where $P$ is a minimal parabolic subgroup of $G$.

This space is compact and homogeneous under the action of $G$. More generally, quotients $G/Q$ by parabolic subgroups $Q$ are generalized flag manifolds, and the Furstenberg boundary is the maximal one among these in the sense that every quotient by a parabolic subgroup is a factor of $G/P$.

For example, if $G=\mathrm{SL}(n,\mathbb R)$, then the Furstenberg boundary is the manifold of complete flags in $\mathbb R^n$. For $G=\mathrm{SL}(2,\mathbb R)$, it is $\mathbb{RP}^1$.

== Relation to Poisson boundaries ==
Let $\mu$ be a probability measure on $G$. A function $f$ on $G$ is called $\mu$-harmonic if

$$f(g)=\int_G f(gg')\,d\mu(g').$$

The Poisson boundary of the measured group $(G,\mu)$ is a measure space that represents bounded $\mu$-harmonic functions by boundary integrals. Unlike the Furstenberg boundary, the Poisson boundary depends on the choice of the measure $\mu$.

For semisimple Lie groups, Furstenberg showed that for broad classes of measures the Poisson boundary can be realized on a homogeneous boundary of the form $G/Q$, where $Q$ is a parabolic subgroup. In particular situations the maximal boundary $G/P$ plays the role of a universal homogeneous boundary from which the others are obtained as quotients.
