= Elizabeth Wilmer =

American mathematician

Elizabeth Lee Wilmer is an American mathematician known for her work on Markov chain mixing times. She is a professor, and former department head, of mathematics at Oberlin College.

As a 16-year-old high school student at Stuyvesant High School and captain of the school mathematics team, Wilmer won second place in the Westinghouse Science Talent Search in 1987, for a project involving 3-coloring of graphs. The first-place winner that year was also female, marking the first year that the top two prizes both went to women. As an undergraduate at Harvard College, she led the university's team that won the first Mathematical Contest in Modeling of the Society for Industrial and Applied Mathematics, and she was one of the two inaugural winners of the Alice T. Schafer Prize of the Association for Women in Mathematics for excellence by a woman in undergraduate mathematics. She graduated from Harvard in 1991, and completed her Ph.D. at Harvard in 1999. She worked with Persi Diaconis for her doctoral dissertation, Exact Rates of Convergence for Some Simple Non-Reversible Markov Chains, but after Diaconis moved from Harvard to Stanford in 1997 her official doctoral advisor became Joe Harris.

With David A. Levin and Yuval Peres, Wilmer is the author of the textbook Markov Chains and Mixing Times (American Mathematical Society, 2009; 2nd ed., 2017).

As of September 2022, Wilmer is a rotating program officer at the National Science Foundation in the Probability program.
