= Schwarz lemma =

Statement in complex analysis

In mathematics, the Schwarz lemma, named after Hermann Amandus Schwarz, is a result in complex differential geometry that estimates the (squared) pointwise norm $|\partial f |^2$ of a holomorphic map $f:(X,g_X) \to (Y,g_Y)$ between Hermitian manifolds under curvature assumptions on $g_X$ and $g_Y$.

The classical Schwarz lemma is a result in complex analysis typically viewed to be about holomorphic functions from the open unit disk $\mathbb{D} := \{ z \in \mathbb{C} : | z | < 1 \}$ to itself.

The Schwarz lemma has opened several branches of complex geometry, and become an essential tool in the use of geometric PDE methods in complex geometry.

== Statement of the classical Schwarz Lemma ==
Let $\mathbf{D} = \{z : |z| < 1\}$ be the open unit disk in the complex plane $\mathbb{C}$ centered at the origin, and let $f : \mathbf{D}\rightarrow \mathbb{C}$ be a holomorphic map such that $f(0) = 0$ and $|f(z)|\leq 1$ on $\mathbf{D}$.

Then $|f(z)| \leq |z|$ for all $z \in \mathbf{D}$, and $|f'(0)| \leq 1$.

Moreover, if $|f(z)| = |z|$ for some non-zero $z$ or $|f'(0)| = 1$, then $f(z) = az$ for some $a \in \mathbb{C}$ with $|a| = 1$.

== Proof of the classical Schwarz lemma ==
The proof, which first appears in a paper by Carathéodory, where it is attributed to Erhard Schmidt, is a straightforward application of the maximum modulus principle on the function

$$g(z) = \begin{cases}
\frac{f(z)}{z}\, & \mbox{if } z \neq 0 \\
f'(0) & \mbox{if } z = 0,
\end{cases}$$

which is holomorphic on the whole of $\mathbb{D}$, including at the origin (because $f$ is differentiable at the origin and fixes zero). Now if $\mathbb{D}_r = \{z : |z| \le r\}$ denotes the closed disk of radius $r$ centered at the origin, then the maximum modulus principle implies that, for $r < 1$, given any $z \in \mathbb{D}_r$, there exists $z_r$ on the boundary of $\mathbb{D}_r$ such that

$$|g(z)| \le |g(z_r)| = \frac{|f(z_r)|}{|z_r|} \le \frac{1}{r}.$$

As $r \rightarrow 1$ we get $|g(z)| \leq 1$.

Moreover, suppose that $|f(z)| = |z|$ for some non-zero $z \in \mathbb{D}$, or $|f'(0)| = 1$. Then, $|g(z)| = 1$ at some point of $\mathbb{D}$. So by the maximum modulus principle, $g(z)$ is equal to a constant $a$ such that $|a| = 1$. Therefore, $f(z) = az$, as desired.

== Schwarz–Pick theorem ==
A variant of the Schwarz lemma, known as the Schwarz–Pick theorem (after Georg Pick), characterizes the analytic automorphisms of the unit disc, i.e. bijective holomorphic mappings of the unit disc to itself:

Let $f: \mathbf{D}\to\mathbf{D}$ be holomorphic. Then, for all $z_1,z_2\in\mathbf{D}$,

$$\left|\frac{f(z_1)-f(z_2)}{1-\overline{f(z_1)}f(z_2)}\right| \le \left|\frac{z_1-z_2}{1-\overline{z_1}z_2}\right|$$

and, for all $z\in\mathbf{D}$,

$$\frac{\left|f'(z)\right|}{1-\left|f(z)\right|^2} \le \frac{1}{1-\left|z\right|^2}.$$

The expression

$$d(z_1,z_2)=\tanh^{-1} \left|\frac{z_1-z_2}{1-\overline{z_1}z_2}\right|$$

is the distance of the points $z_1$, $z_2$ in the Poincaré metric, i.e. the metric in the Poincaré disk model for hyperbolic geometry in dimension two. The Schwarz–Pick theorem then essentially states that a holomorphic map of the unit disk into itself decreases the distance of points in the Poincaré metric. If equality holds throughout in one of the two inequalities above (which is equivalent to saying that the holomorphic map preserves the distance in the Poincaré metric), then $f$ must be an analytic automorphism of the unit disc, given by a Möbius transformation mapping the unit disc to itself.

An analogous statement on the upper half-plane $\mathbf{H}$ can be made as follows:

Let $f:\mathbf{H}\to\mathbf{H}$ be holomorphic. Then, for all $z_1,z_2\in\mathbf{H}$,

$$\left|\frac{f(z_1)-f(z_2)}{\overline{f(z_1)}-f(z_2)}\right|\le \frac{\left|z_1-z_2\right|}{\left|\overline{z_1}-z_2\right|}.$$

This is an easy consequence of the Schwarz–Pick theorem mentioned above: One just needs to remember that the Cayley transform $W(z) = (z-i)/(z+i)$ maps the upper half-plane $\mathbf{H}$ conformally onto the unit disc $\mathbf{D}$. Then, the map $W\circ f\circ W^{-1}$ is a holomorphic map from $\mathbf{D}$ onto $\mathbf{D}$. Using the Schwarz–Pick theorem on this map, and finally simplifying the results by using the formula for $W$, we get the desired result. Also, for all $z\in\mathbf{H}$,

$$\frac{\left|f'(z)\right|}{\text{Im}(f(z))} \le \frac{1}{\text{Im}(z)}.$$

If equality holds for either the one or the other expressions, then $f$ must be a Möbius transformation with real coefficients. That is, if equality holds, then

$$f(z)=\frac{az+b}{cz+d}$$

with $a,b,c,d\in\mathbb{R}$ and $ad-bc>0$.

== Proof of Schwarz–Pick theorem ==
The proof of the Schwarz–Pick theorem follows from Schwarz's lemma and the fact that a Möbius transformation of the form

$$\frac{z-z_0}{\overline{z_0}z-1}, \qquad |z_0| < 1,$$

maps the unit circle to itself. Fix $z_1$ and define the Möbius transformations

$$M(z)=\frac{z_1-z}{1-\overline{z_1}z}, \qquad \varphi(z)=\frac{f(z_1)-z}{1-\overline{f(z_1)}z}.$$

Since $M(z_1)=0$ and the Möbius transformation is invertible, the composition $\varphi(f(M^{-1}(z)))$ maps $0$ to $0$ and the unit disk is mapped into itself. Thus we can apply Schwarz's lemma, which is to say

$$\left |\varphi\left(f(M^{-1}(z))\right) \right|=\left|\frac{f(z_1)-f(M^{-1}(z))}{1-\overline{f(z_1)}f(M^{-1}(z))}\right| \le |z|.$$

Now calling $z_2=M^{-1}(z)$ (which will still be in the unit disk) yields the desired conclusion

$$\left|\frac{f(z_1)-f(z_2)}{1-\overline{f(z_1)}f(z_2)}\right| \le \left|\frac{z_1-z_2}{1-\overline{z_1}z_2}\right|.$$

To prove the second part of the theorem, we rearrange the left-hand side into the difference quotient and let $z_2$ tend to $z_1$.

== Further generalizations and related results ==
The Schwarz–Ahlfors–Pick theorem provides an analogous theorem for hyperbolic manifolds.

De Branges' theorem, formerly known as the Bieberbach Conjecture, is an important extension of the lemma, giving restrictions on the higher derivatives of $f$ at $0$ in case $f$ is injective; that is, univalent.

The Koebe 1/4 theorem provides a related estimate in the case that $f$ is univalent.

== See also ==
- Nevanlinna–Pick interpolation
- Kobayashi hyperbolicity
- Bloch's principle
