= Georg Alexander Pick =

Austrian mathematician and holocaust victim (1859–1942)

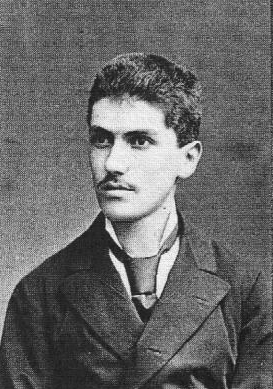
- Georg Pick, 1885
- Born: 10 August 1859; Vienna, Austria-Hungary
- Died: 26 July 1942 (aged 82); Theresienstadt concentration camp, Czechoslovakia
- Education: University of Vienna
- Known for: Pick's theorem Schwarz–Pick lemma Schwarz–Ahlfors–Pick theorem Nevanlinna–Pick interpolation
- Scientific career
- Fields: Mathematics
- Workplaces: Charles University in Prague
- Doctoral advisor: Leo Königsberger
- Doctoral students: Charles Loewner; Saly Ruth Ramler

Georg Alexander Pick (10 August 1859 – 26 July 1942) was an Austrian Jewish mathematician who was murdered during The Holocaust. He was born in Vienna to Josefa Schleisinger and Adolf Josef Pick and died at Theresienstadt concentration camp. Today he is best known for Pick's theorem for determining the area of lattice polygons. He published it in an article in 1899; it was popularized when Hugo Dyonizy Steinhaus included it in the 1969 edition of Mathematical Snapshots. He was described as follows: "Pick was a bachelor ... uncommonly correct in clothes and attitude."

== Education and career ==
Pick studied at the University of Vienna and defended his Ph.D. in 1880 under Leo Königsberger and Emil Weyr. After receiving his doctorate he was appointed an assistant to Ernst Mach at the Charles-Ferdinand University in Prague. He became a lecturer there in 1881. He took a leave from the university in 1884 during which he worked with Felix Klein at the University of Leipzig. Other than that year, he remained in Prague until his retirement in 1927 at which time he returned to Vienna.

Pick headed the committee at the (then) German university of Prague, which appointed Albert Einstein to a chair of mathematical physics in 1911. Pick introduced Einstein to the work of Italian mathematicians Gregorio Ricci-Curbastro and Tullio Levi-Civita in the field of absolute differential calculus, which later in 1915 helped Einstein to successfully formulate general relativity.

Charles Loewner was one of his students in Prague. He also directed the doctoral theses of Josef Grünwald, Walter Fröhlich, and Saly Struik. Pick was elected a member of the Czech Academy of Sciences and Arts, but was expelled after Nazis took over Prague.

After retiring in 1927, Pick returned to Vienna, the city where he was born. After the Anschluss when the Nazis marched into Austria on 12 March 1938, Pick returned to Prague. In March 1939 the Nazis invaded Czechoslovakia. Pick was sent to Theresienstadt concentration camp on 13 July 1942. He died there two weeks later.

== See also ==
- Nevanlinna–Pick interpolation
- Pick matrix
- Pick's theorem
