= Beijing Institute of Mathematical Sciences and Applications =

Chinese research institute

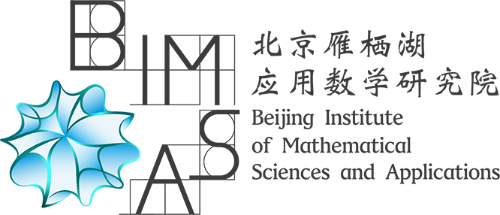
- Type: Research institute
- Established: June 12, 2020; 6 years ago
- Director: Shing-Tung Yau
- Location: Beijing, China
- Website: www.bimsa.cn

The Beijing Institute of Mathematical Sciences and Applications (BIMSA) is a mathematics research institution in Huairou, Beijing, co-sponsored by the Beijing Municipal Government and Tsinghua University.

The International Congress of Basic Science (ICBS) is held at BIMSA.

== History ==
On June 12, 2020, with the support of the Beijing Municipal Government and the efforts of the Beijing Municipal Science and Technology Commission and the Huairou District Government, the Beijing Yanqi Lake Institute of Applied Mathematics (referred to as "Beijing Institute of Applied Mathematics") was officially established. This new research and development institution leverages the mathematical resources of Tsinghua University and the Chinese Academy of Sciences and was initiated by world-renowned mathematician Professor Shing-Tung Yau, director of the Center of Mathematical Sciences at Tsinghua University. Tsinghua University signed a cooperation agreement with the newly established Beijing Institute of Applied Mathematics.

The first president is Shing-Tung Yau, a mathematician known for his work in differential geometry and mathematical physics. He is a Fields Medalist and a Wolf Prize in Mathematics laureate.

== Research ==
The BIMSA conducts research across a wide range of areas in mathematics, physics and information science, from theoretical to applied.

BIMSA has more than 10 research groups active across a range of topics. The research areas include:

- Algebraic Geometry
- Algebraic Topology and its Applications
- Analysis and Geometry
- Artificial Intelligence and Machine Learning
- Computational Mathematics
- Digital Economy
- Mathematical Physics and General Relativity
- Number Theory and Representation Theory
- Quantum Fields and Strings
- Quantum Symmetry
- Statistics, Probability and Data Science

== Graduate Program ==
BIMSA has established long-term cooperative relationships with various universities to jointly train doctoral students, leveraging the teaching and research strengths of both parties. Graduates receive doctoral degree certificates and diplomas from the respective universities. Currently, BIMSA is conducting joint doctoral training programs with the Academy of Mathematics and Systems Science of the Chinese Academy of Sciences, the University of the Chinese Academy of Sciences, and the Institute of Statistics and Big Data at Renmin University of China. The first cohort of joint doctoral students with the Academy of Mathematics and Systems Science of the Chinese Academy of Sciences, the University of the Chinese Academy of Sciences, and Beihang University officially started and enrolled in 2023.

== See also ==
- Tsinghua University
- Shing-Tung Yau
