= Torkel Franzén =

Swedish academic (1950–2006)

- Born: 1 April 1950; Norrbotten County
- Died: 19 April 2006 (aged 56); Stockholm
- Known for: work on Gödel's incompleteness theorems contributions to Usenet

Academic work
- Discipline: mathematics computer science
- Sub-discipline: mathematical logic
- Institutions: Luleå University of Technology
- Notable works: Gödel's Theorem: An Incomplete Guide to its Use and Abuse

Torkel Franzén (1 April 1950, Norrbotten County – 19 April 2006, Stockholm) was a Swedish academic.

== Biography ==
Franzén worked at the Department of Computer Science and Electrical Engineering at Luleå University of Technology, Sweden, in the fields of mathematical logic and computer science. He was known for his work on Gödel's incompleteness theorems and for his contributions to Usenet. He was active in the online science fiction fan community, and even issued his own electronic fanzine Frotz on his fiftieth birthday. He died of bone cancer at age 56.

== Selected works ==
- Gödel's Theorem: An Incomplete Guide to its Use and Abuse. Wellesley, Massachusetts: A K Peters, Ltd., 2005. x + 172 pp. ISBN 1-56881-238-8.
- Inexhaustibility: A Non-Exhaustive Treatment. Wellesley, Massachusetts: A K Peters, Ltd., 2004. Lecture Notes in Logic, #16, Association for Symbolic Logic. ISBN 1-56881-174-8.
- The Popular Impact of Gödel's Incompleteness Theorem, Notices of the American Mathematical Society, 53, #4 (April 2006), pp. 440–443.
- Provability and Truth (Acta universitatis stockholmiensis, Stockholm Studies in Philosophy 9) (1987) ISBN 91-22-01158-7

== See also ==
- Gödel's incompleteness theorems
