= Murakami–Yano formula =

Geometric formula for finding volume

In geometry, the Murakami–Yano formula, introduced by Murakami & Yano (2005), is a formula for the volume of a hyperbolic or spherical tetrahedron given in terms of its dihedral angles.
