= Saly Ruth Ramler =

Mathematician

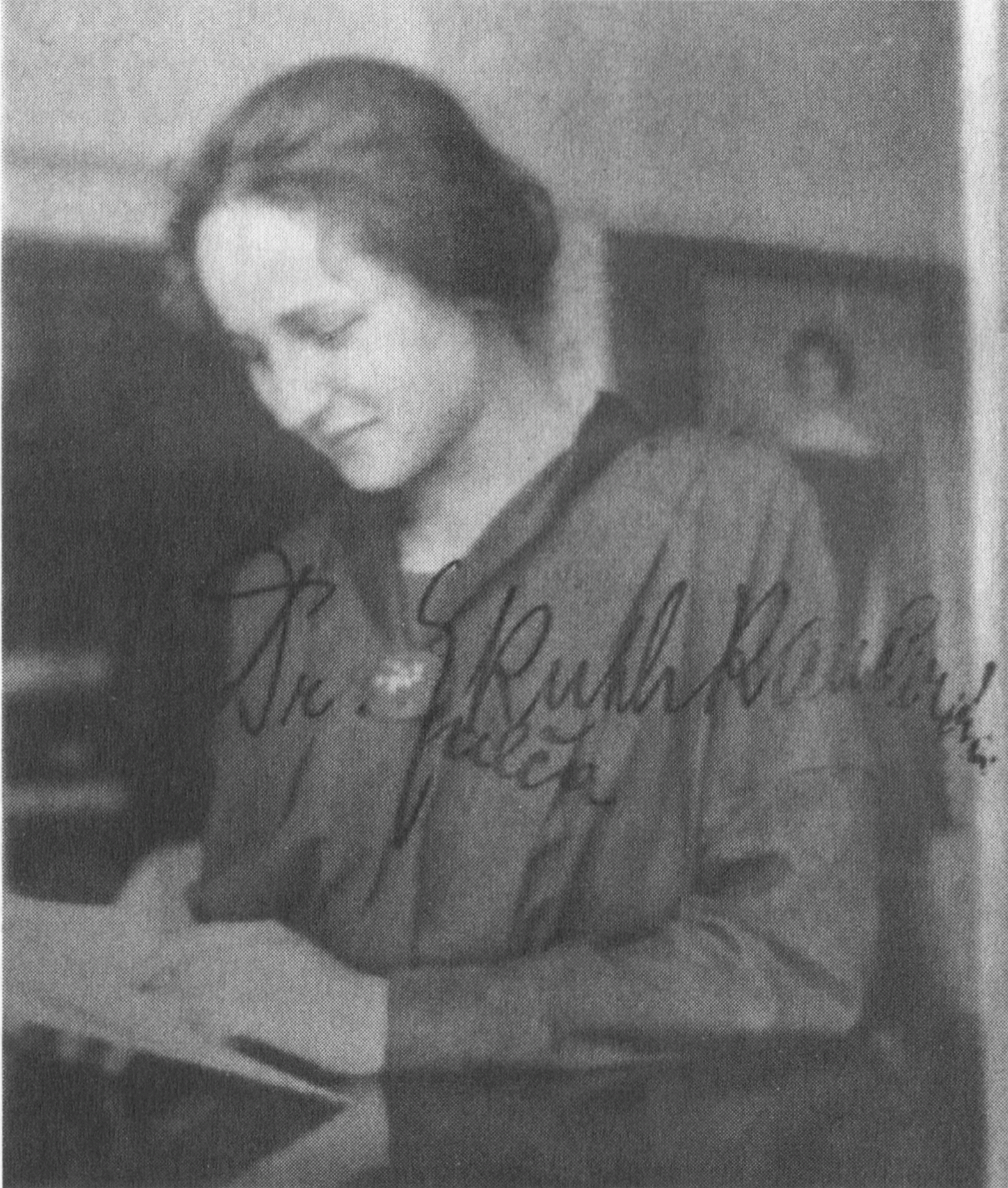
- Born: November 10, 1894; Kolomyia
- Died: 1993 (aged 98–99)
- Education: Charles University in Prague
- Known for: First woman to receive a math PhD from Charles University
- Scientific career
- Fields: Mathematics
- Doctoral advisor: Gerhard Kowalewski; Georg Alexander Pick

Saly Ruth Ramler (1894–1993), also known as Saly Ruth Struik, was the first woman to receive a PhD in mathematics from the German University in Prague, now known as Charles University.

== Life and work ==
Her 1919 dissertation, on the axioms of affine geometry, was supervised by Gerhard Kowalewski and Georg Alexander Pick. She married the Dutch mathematician and historian of mathematics Dirk Jan Struik in 1923. Between 1924 and 1926, the pair traveled through Europe and met many prominent mathematicians, using Dirk Struik's Rockefeller fellowship. In 1926, they emigrated to the United States, and Dirk Struik accepted a position at MIT.
