= Schwarz–Ahlfors–Pick theorem =

Extension of the Schwarz lemma for hyperbolic geometry

In mathematics, the Schwarz–Ahlfors–Pick theorem is an extension of the Schwarz lemma for hyperbolic geometry, such as the Poincaré half-plane model.

The Schwarz–Pick lemma states that every holomorphic function from the unit disk U to itself, or from the upper half-plane H to itself, will not increase the Poincaré distance between points. The unit disk U with the Poincaré metric has negative Gaussian curvature −1. In 1938, Lars Ahlfors generalised the lemma to maps from the unit disk to other negatively curved surfaces:

Theorem (Schwarz–Ahlfors–Pick). Let U be the unit disk with Poincaré metric $\rho$; let S be a Riemann surface endowed with a Hermitian metric $\sigma$ whose Gaussian curvature is ≤ −1; let $f:U\rightarrow S$ be a holomorphic function. Then

$$\sigma(f(z_1),f(z_2)) \leq \rho(z_1,z_2)$$

for all $z_1,z_2 \in U.$

A generalization of this theorem was proved by Shing-Tung Yau in 1973.
