= Arithmetic progression topologies =

In general topology and number theory, branches of mathematics, one can define various topologies on the set $\mathbb{Z}$ of integers or the set $\mathbb{Z}_{>0}$ of positive integers by taking as a base a suitable collection of arithmetic progressions, sequences of the form $\{b,b+a,b+2a,...\}$ or $\{...,b-2a,b-a,b,b+a,b+2a,...\}.$ The open sets will then be unions of arithmetic progressions in the collection. Three examples are the Furstenberg topology on $\mathbb{Z}$, and the Golomb topology and the Kirch topology on $\mathbb{Z}_{>0}$. Precise definitions are given below.

Hillel Furstenberg introduced the first topology in order to provide a "topological" proof of the infinitude of the set of primes. The second topology was studied by Solomon Golomb and provides an example of a countably infinite Hausdorff space that is connected. The third topology, introduced by A.M. Kirch, is an example of a countably infinite Hausdorff space that is both connected and locally connected. These topologies also have interesting separation and homogeneity properties.

The notion of an arithmetic progression topology can be generalized to arbitrary Dedekind domains.

== Construction ==
Two-sided arithmetic progressions in $\mathbb{Z}$ are subsets of the form

$$a\mathbb{Z}+b := \{an+b : n\in\mathbb{Z}\},$$

where $a,b\in\mathbb{Z}$ and $a>0.$ The intersection of two such arithmetic progressions is either empty, or is another arithmetic progression of the same form:

$$(a\mathbb{Z}+b) \cap (c\mathbb{Z}+b) = \operatorname{lcm}(a,c)\mathbb{Z}+b,$$

where $\operatorname{lcm}(a,c)$ is the least common multiple of $a$ and $c.$

Similarly, one-sided arithmetic progressions in $\mathbb{Z}_{>0}=\{1,2,...\}$ are subsets of the form

$$a\mathbb{N}+b := \{an+b : n\in\mathbb{N}\} = \{b,a+b,2a+b,...\},$$

with $\mathbb{N}=\{0,1,2,...\}$ and $a,b>0$. The intersection of two such arithmetic progressions is either empty, or is another arithmetic progression of the same form:

$$(a\mathbb{N}+b) \cap (c\mathbb{N}+d) = \operatorname{lcm}(a,c)\mathbb{N}+q,$$

with $q$ equal to the smallest element in the intersection.

This shows that every nonempty intersection of a finite number of arithmetic progressions is again an arithmetic progression. One can then define a topology on $\mathbb{Z}$ or $\mathbb{Z}_{>0}$ by choosing a collection $\mathcal{B}$ of arithmetic progressions, declaring all elements of $\mathcal{B}$ to be open sets, and taking the topology generated by those. If any nonempty intersection of two elements of $\mathcal{B}$ is again an element of $\mathcal{B}$, the collection $\mathcal{B}$ will be a base for the topology. In general, it will be a subbase for the topology, and the set of all arithmetic progressions that are nonempty finite intersections of elements of $\mathcal{B}$ will be a base for the topology. Three special cases follow.

The Furstenberg topology, or evenly spaced integer topology, on the set $\mathbb{Z}$ of integers is obtained by taking as a base the collection of all $a\mathbb{Z}+b$ with $a,b\in\mathbb{Z}$ and $a>0.$

The Golomb topology, or relatively prime integer topology, on the set $\mathbb{Z}_{>0}$ of positive integers is obtained by taking as a base the collection of all $a\mathbb{N}+b$ with $a,b>0$ and $a$ and $b$ relatively prime. Equivalently, the subcollection of such sets with the extra condition $b<a$ also forms a base for the topology. The corresponding topological space is called the Golomb space.

The Kirch topology, or prime integer topology, on the set $\mathbb{Z}_{>0}$ of positive integers is obtained by taking as a subbase the collection of all $p\mathbb{N}+b$ with $b>0$ and $p$ prime not dividing $b.$ Equivalently, one can take as a subbase the collection of all $p\mathbb{N}+b$ with $p$ prime and $0<b<p$. A base for the topology consists of all $a\mathbb{N}+b$ with relatively prime $a,b>0$ and $a$ squarefree (or the same with the additional condition $b<a$). The corresponding topological space is called the Kirch space.

The three topologies are related in the sense that every open set in the Kirch topology is open in the Golomb topology, and every open set in the Golomb topology is open in the Furstenberg topology (restricted to the subspace $\mathbb{Z}_{>0}$). On the set $\mathbb{Z}_{>0}$, the Kirch topology is coarser than the Golomb topology, which is itself coarser that the Furstenberg topology.

== Properties ==
The Golomb topology and the Kirch topology are Hausdorff, but not regular.

The Furstenberg topology is Hausdorff and regular. It is metrizable, but not completely metrizable. Indeed, it is homeomorphic to the rational numbers $\mathbb{Q}$ with the subspace topology inherited from the real line. Broughan has shown that the Furstenberg topology is closely related to the p-adic completion of the rational numbers.

Regarding connectedness properties, the Furstenberg topology is totally disconnected. The Golomb topology is connected, but not locally connected. The Kirch topology is both connected and locally connected.

The integers with the Furstenberg topology form a homogeneous space, because it is a topological ring — in some sense, the only topology on $\mathbb{Z}$ for which it is a ring. By contrast, the Golomb space and the Kirch space are topologically rigid — the only self-homeomorphism is the trivial one.

== Relation to the infinitude of primes ==
Both the Furstenberg and Golomb topologies furnish a proof that there are infinitely many prime numbers. A sketch of the proof runs as follows:

1. Fix a prime p and note that the (positive, in the Golomb space case) integers are a union of finitely many residue classes modulo p. Each residue class is an arithmetic progression, and thus clopen.
2. Consider the multiples of each prime. These multiples are a residue class (so closed), and the union of these sets is all (Golomb: positive) integers except the units ±1.
3. If there are finitely many primes, that union is a closed set, and so its complement ({±1}) is open.
4. But every nonempty open set is infinite, so {±1} is not open.

== Generalizations ==
The Furstenberg topology is a special case of the profinite topology on a group. In detail, it is the topology induced by the inclusion $\Z\subset \hat\Z$, where $\hat\Z$ is the profinite integer ring with its profinite topology.

The notion of an arithmetic progression makes sense in arbitrary $\mathbb{Z}$-modules, but the construction of a topology on them relies on closure under intersection. Instead, the correct generalization builds a topology out of ideals of a Dedekind domain. This procedure produces a large number of countably infinite, Hausdorff, connected sets, but whether different Dedekind domains can produce homeomorphic topological spaces is a topic of current research.
