= Fuchsian model =

Group representation of a Riemann surface

In mathematics, a Fuchsian model is a representation of a hyperbolic Riemann surface R as a quotient of the upper half-plane H by a Fuchsian group. Every hyperbolic Riemann surface admits such a representation. The concept is named after Lazarus Fuchs.

== A more precise definition ==
By the uniformization theorem, every Riemann surface is either elliptic, parabolic or hyperbolic. More precisely this theorem states that a Riemann surface $R$ which is not isomorphic to either the Riemann sphere (the elliptic case) or a quotient of the complex plane by a discrete subgroup (the parabolic case) must be a quotient of the hyperbolic plane $\mathbb H$ by a subgroup $\Gamma$ acting properly discontinuously and freely.

In the Poincaré half-plane model for the hyperbolic plane the group of biholomorphic transformations is the group $\mathrm{PSL}_2(\mathbb R)$ acting by homographies, and the uniformization theorem means that there exists a discrete, torsion-free subgroup $\Gamma \subset \mathrm{PSL}_2(\mathbb R)$ such that the Riemann surface $\Gamma \backslash \mathbb H$ is isomorphic to $R$. Such a group is called a Fuchsian group, and the isomorphism $R \cong \Gamma \backslash \mathbb H$ is called a Fuchsian model for $R$.

== Fuchsian models and Teichmüller space ==
Let $R$ be a closed hyperbolic surface and let $\Gamma$ be a Fuchsian group so that $\Gamma \backslash \mathbb H$ is a Fuchsian model for $R$. Let $A(\Gamma) = \{ \rho \colon \Gamma \to \mathrm{PSL}_2(\Reals)\colon \rho \text{ is faithful and discrete }\}$ and endow this set with the topology of pointwise convergence (sometimes called "algebraic convergence"). In this particular case this topology can most easily be defined as follows: the group $\Gamma$ is finitely generated since it is isomorphic to the fundamental group of $R$. Let $g_1, \ldots, g_r$ be a generating set: then any $\rho \in A(\Gamma)$ is determined by the elements $\rho(g_1), \ldots, \rho(g_r)$ and so we can identify $A(\Gamma)$ with a subset of $\mathrm{PSL}_2(\mathbb R)^r$ by the map $\rho \mapsto (\rho(g_1), \ldots, \rho(g_r))$. Then we give it the subspace topology.

The Nielsen isomorphism theorem (this is not standard terminology and this result is not directly related to the Dehn–Nielsen theorem) then has the following statement:

For any $\rho\in A(\Gamma)$ there exists a self-homeomorphism (in fact a quasiconformal map) $h$ of the upper half-plane $\mathbb H$ such that $h \circ \gamma \circ h^{-1} = \rho(\gamma)$ for all $\gamma \in \Gamma$.

The proof is very simple: choose an homeomorphism $R \to \rho(\Gamma) \backslash \mathbb H$ and lift it to the hyperbolic plane. Taking a diffeomorphism yields quasi-conformal map since $R$ is compact.

This result can be seen as the equivalence between two models for Teichmüller space of $R$: the set of discrete faithful representations of the fundamental group $\pi_1(R)$ into $\mathrm{PSL}_2(\mathbb R)$ modulo conjugacy and the set of marked Riemann surfaces $(X, f)$ where $f\colon R \to X$ is a quasiconformal homeomorphism modulo a natural equivalence relation.

== See also ==
- the Kleinian model, an analogous construction for 3-manifolds
- Fundamental polygon
