= Kleinian model =

In mathematics, a Kleinian model is a model of a three-dimensional hyperbolic manifold N by the quotient space $\mathbb{H}^3 / \Gamma$ where $\Gamma$ is a discrete subgroup of PSL(2,C). Here, the subgroup $\Gamma$, a Kleinian group, is defined so that it is isomorphic to the fundamental group $\pi_1(N)$ of the surface N. Many authors use the terms Kleinian group and Kleinian model interchangeably, letting one stand for the other. The concept is named after Felix Klein.

In less technical terms, a Kleinian model it is a way of assigning coordinates to a hyperbolic manifold, or a three-dimensional space in which every point locally resembles hyperbolic space. A Kleinian model is created by taking three-dimensional hyperbolic space and treating two points as equivalent if and only if they can be reached from each other by applying a member of a group action of a Kleinian group on the space. A Kleinian group is any discrete subgroup, consisting only of isolated points, of orientation-preserving isometries of hyperbolic 3-space. The group action of a group is a set of functions on a set which, roughly speaking, have the same structure as a group.

Many properties of Kleinian models are in direct analogy to those of Fuchsian models; however, overall, the theory is less well developed. A number of unsolved conjectures on Kleinian models are the analogs to theorems on Fuchsian models.

== See also ==
- Hyperbolic 3-manifold
