= Gustav Elfving =

Finnish mathematician and statistician

Erik Gustav Elfving
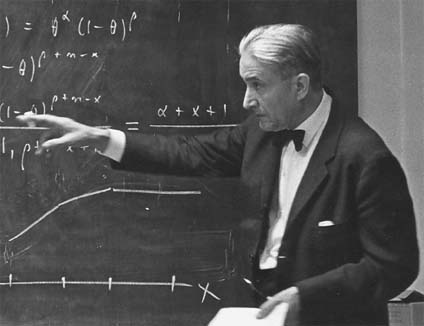
- Born: 25 June 1908; Helsinki, Finland
- Died: 25 March 1984 (aged 75); Helsinki, Finland
- Education: University of Helsinki
- Known for: Elfving sets, Elfving's theorem in the optimal design of experiments
- Awards: Fellow of the Institute of Mathematical Statistics, Elected Member of the International Statistical Institute, Honorary Foreign Member of the Royal Swedish Academy of Sciences
- Scientific career
- Fields: Statistics, Probability theory
- Workplaces: Helsinki University of Technology, University of Helsinki
- Doctoral advisor: Rolf Nevanlinna
- Doctoral students: Pentti Suomela; Elja Arjas

Erik Gustav Elfving (25 June 1908 – 25 March 1984) was a Finnish mathematician and statistician. He wrote pioneering works in mathematical statistics, especially on the design of experiments.

== Early life ==
Erik Gustav Elfving was son of Fredrik Elfving (1854–1942), a professor of botany at the University of Helsinki, and Thyra Elfving (née Ingman). He was the youngest of four children. Gustav Elfving earned excellent grades at the Svenska normallyceum i Helsingfors, a Helsinki gymnasium for Swedish-speaking boys, from which he graduated in 1926. In the same year he enrolled at the University of Helsinki, planning to major in astronomy. He switched to mathematics, graduating in 1930 in mathematics, with astronomy and physics as minor subjects. From 1927 to 1929, he worked as a computational assistant at the astronomical observatory of the University of Helsinki. He studied probability theory under J. W. Lindeberg, who is now known for Lindeberg's condition for the central limit theorem. He wrote his (1934) dissertation under the supervision of Rolf Nevanlinna; his thesis studied Riemann surfaces and their uniformization. In the Nevanlinna theory of the values of meromorphic functions, Elfving's results were praised by Drasin.

=== Fiancée's death and his 1935 expedition to Greenland ===
Elfving was engaged to a young woman, who died in 1935, probably from tuberculosis. The grieving parents of his fiancée helped Elfving contact the Danish Geodetic Institute, which hired him as the mathematician for a cartographic expedition to Western Greenland in the summer of 1935. Elfving was photographed while he made theodolite measurements and peered from a tent. Heavy rains forced the expedition to remain sheltered in their tents for three days, during which Elfving started to think about the best locations to take measurements for least squares estimation.

== Statistical research ==
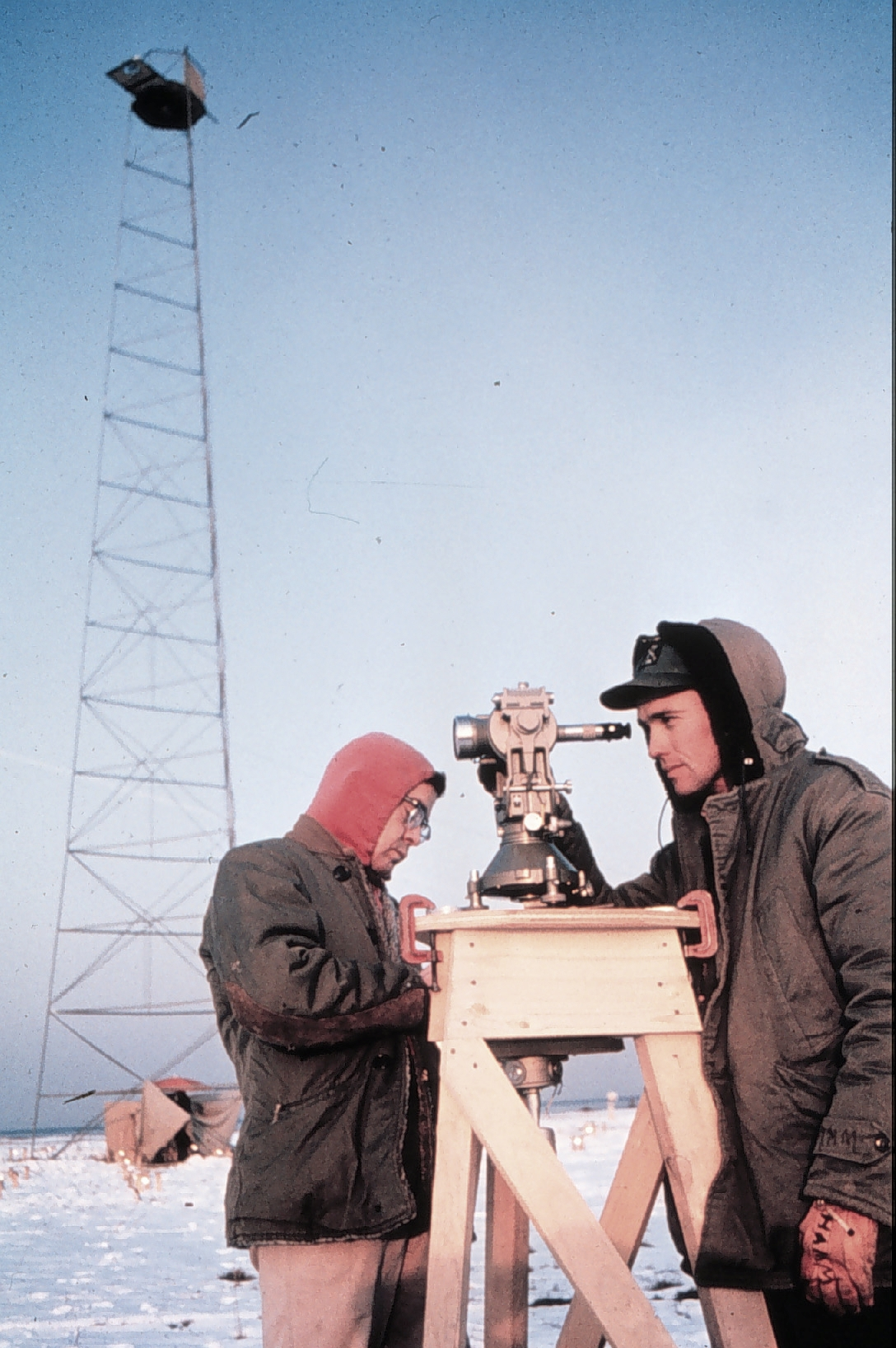
Gustav Elfving invented the optimal design of experiments, and so minimized surveyors' need for theodolite measurements (pictured), while trapped in his tent in storm-ridden Greenland.

In statistics, Elfving did research in the design of experiments, probability theory, and statistical inference, as well as applications.

=== Optimal design of experiments ===
In statistics, Elfving is known as one of the founders of the modern theory of the optimal design of experiments. While accompanying a surveying expedition to western Greenland, extended and intense rains left Elving with three days in his tent, during which time he considered the best locations of observations to estimate parameters of linear models. Elfving's ideas appeared in his paper on the optimal design of experiments for estimating linear models. This paper also introduced concepts from convex geometry, including "Elfving sets" and Elfving's theorem. Being symmetric, Elfving sets are formed by the union of a set and its reflection through the origin, −S ∪ S. According to Chernoff (1999, p. 204), Elfving was generous in crediting others' results: His paper in the Cramér-festschrift acknowledged unpublished notes of L. J. Savage; Elfving was a referee for the fundamental paper on optimal designs by Kiefer and Wolfowitz.

=== Other statistical contributions ===
As a Professor at the University of Helsinki, Elfving was responsible for writing Finnish language texts, which were used for decades. In his texts and reviews, Elfving emphasized the decision-theoretic foundations of statistics, following Neyman, Pearson, and Wald, and recognized the value of Bayesian methods in statistics and also in operations research. Elfving introduced the statistical symbol for probabilistic independence ⊥⊥, which is a stronger condition than orthogonality ⊥, by the 1950s.

Elfving made notable contributions in many fields. In mathematics, he did research in complex analysis and probability theory (particularly Markov and point processes). In statistical theory, his most influential work was in optimal design, but he also worked in sampling theory, psychometrics, applied statistics, and the decision sciences (including decision theory, game theory, and Bayesian statistics). He also contributed to mathematics education by writing textbooks, book reviews, and popular science. He wrote papers and a book on the history of mathematics.

==== Students ====
He also supervised many students. Elja Arjas is known for his work on inference on stochastic processes and reliability theory, as well as for his supervision of Esa Nummelin and Hannu Oja. Johann Fellman has studied optimal designs for nonsingular or nondifferentiable information functions as well economic theory, and genetics (particularly the frequency of twin births) and for his supervision of Kenneth Nordström and Katarina Juselius.

== Academic and scientific offices ==
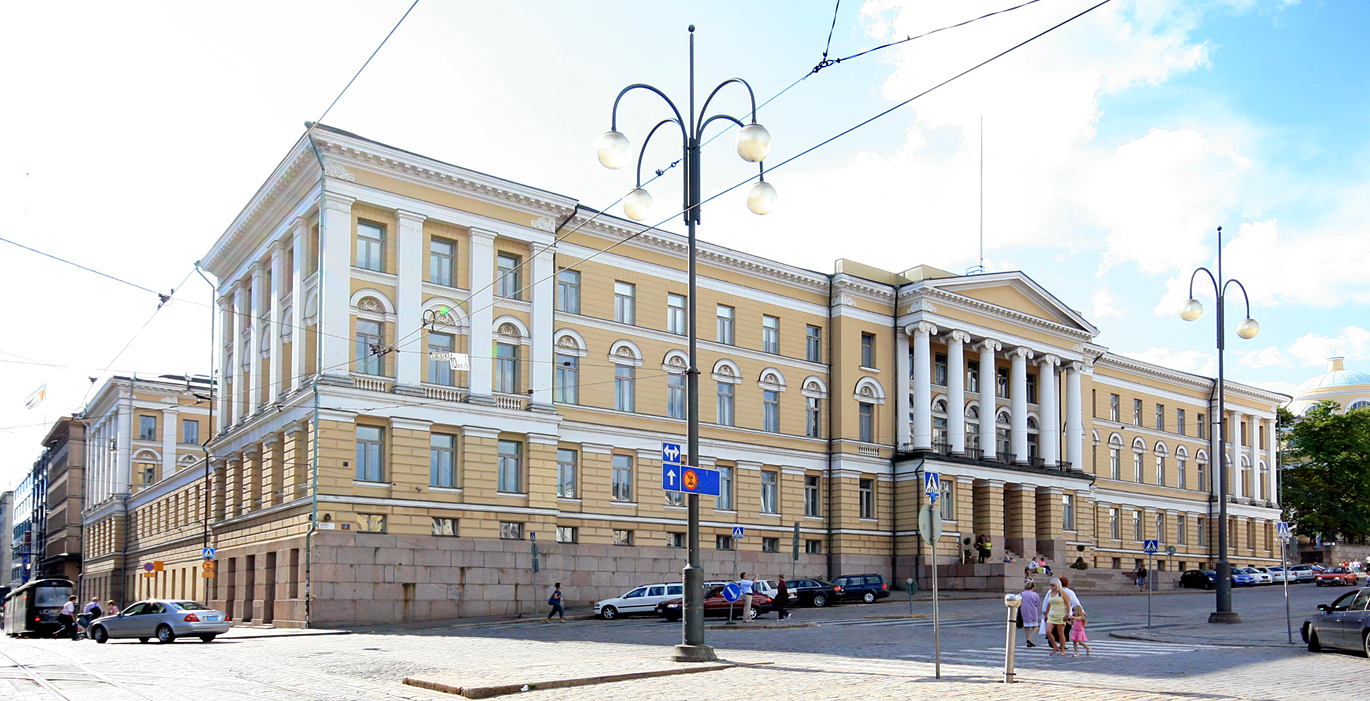
Elfving graduated from the University of Helsinki.

During 1938–1945, Elfving worked as a lecturer at the Helsinki University of Technology. During the academic year 1946–1947, Elfving served as locum tenens professor at Stockholm University. In 1948 Elfving became a Professor of Mathematics at the University of Helsinki succeeding Lars Ahlfors, who had moved to Harvard University. Elfving visited William Feller at Cornell University in 1949 and 1950. He was an invited plenary speaker at the Third Berkeley Symposium on Probability and Mathematical Statistics in 1955. That same year, he visited Columbia University in the Spring, at the invitation of Theodore W. Anderson, Herbert Robbins, and Herbert Solomon. He visited Solomon again at Stanford University during the fall of 1960 and the spring of 1966.

He was elected as a fellow of the Institute of Mathematical Statistics in 1955 and an elected member of the International Statistical Institute in 1963. Elfving was elected as a foreign member of the Swedish Academy of Sciences in 1974, the same year that he was elected to the Royal Statistical Society. He served on the editorial boards of three international journals: Probability Theory and Related Fields (1962–1975), The Annals of Mathematical Statistics (1964–1967), and Mathematica Scandinavica (1953–1972). Elfving had a deep sense of honor and propriety: When he resigned from the editorial boards following decades of service, he requested that he not be sent complimentary issues of the journals; when he failed to accomplish high levels of research, he offered to return the funding to the granting agency.

At the University of Helsinki from 1964 to 1975, Elfving acted as the "inspector" of the Åbo Nation, a Swedish-speaking "nation" at the University of Helsinki. In Finnish and Swedish universities, "nations" are student associations with similarities to fraternities or cooperatives; the inspector is a highly respected university officer, usually a senior professor, who officiates and delivers addresses at formal functions.

== Bibliography ==
- Elfving, G. (1952). "Optimum allocation in linear regression theory". Annals of Mathematical Statistics. 23 (2): 255–262. doi:10.1214/aoms/1177729442. MR 0047998.
- Elfving, G. (1959). "Design of linear experiments". In Grenander, Ulf (ed.). Probability and statistics: The Harald Cramér volume. Almqvist & Wiksell, Stockholm; John Wiley & Sons, New York. pp. 58–74. MR 0111106.
- Elfving, Gustav (1981). The history of mathematics in Finland 1828–1918. Helsinki: Societas Scientarium Fennica.
