= Hilbert geometry =

The term Hilbert geometry may refer to several things named after David Hilbert:

- Hilbert's axioms, a modern axiomatization of Euclidean geometry
- Hilbert space, a space in many ways resembling a Euclidean space, but in important instances infinite-dimensional
- Hilbert metric, a metric that makes a bounded convex subset of a Euclidean space into an unbounded metric space
