= Yakov Feld =

Soviet physicist

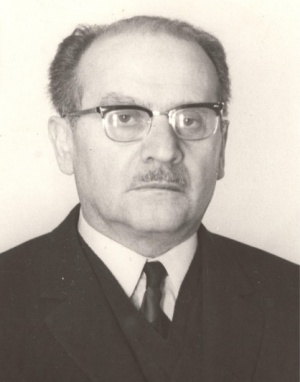
- Born: March 10, 1912; Kiev
- Died: August 28, 1995 (aged 83); Moscow
- Citizenship: Soviet Union, Russia
- Awards: Order of the Red Banner of Labour (1953)
- Scientific career
- Fields: Physics (electrical engineering and antennas)

Yakov Naumovich Feld (March 10, 1912, Kiev — August 28, 1995, Moscow) — Soviet physicist who worked in the field of electrical engineering and antennas; laureate of A.S. Popov prize of the USSR Academy of Sciences (1986), doctor of technical Sciences (1947), Professor (1948).

== Biography ==
After graduating from a vocational school in 1927, Feld went on to complete his studies at the radio faculty of the Kiev College of Communications in 1931.

In 1932 - 1941 he worked as a consultant at the Central Radio Laboratory (CRL) in Leningrad (today's St. Petersburg) under the guidance of Professor V.V. Tatarinov.

In 1939 Feld wrote a PhD thesis on "The General Theory of certain Types of Feeder Systems". As Feld did not have Bachelor or Master diploma at the time, he required a special permission of the All-Union Committee on Higher Education of the Union of People's Commissioners of the USSR allowing him to obtain a PhD.

In 1941 Feld along with other employees of the Central Radio Laboratory (that had been transformed into "Factory 327") were evacuated to Krasnoyarsk. There he worked until 1946 in what is today a scientific-industrial enterprise "Radiosvyaz".

In 1946 Feld joined the laboratory of the academician Nikolai Papaleksi at the Academy of Sciences at the Institute of Physics of the USSR (FIAN). Feld completed a doctorate course and an internship with the academician M. A. Leontovich. In 1947 Feld wrote his doctoral thesis on "The Fundamentals of the Theory of Slit Antennas" and was consequently awarded the title of Professor in 1948.

In February 1946 Feld was invited by M. A. Leontovich to join the Central Science and Research Institute -108 (now the Central Research Radio-engineering Institute A. I. Berg). In 1949 to 1976 Feld headed Antennas department at that institute.

Throughout his life Feld combined research activities with teaching:

- 1934-1941 – Lecturer of Leningrad Electrotechnical Institute of Communication M. A. Bonch-Bruevich, from 1939 - Associate Professor at that Institute;
- 1947-1948 – Associate Professor at the Moscow Aviation Institute;
- 1948-1949 – Professor at the faculty of Physics and Technology of Moscow State University;
- 1950-1960 – Professor at the Zhukovsky Air Force Engineering Academy;
- 1971-1972 – Professor at the Institute of Advanced Training of the Ministry of Radio Industry of the USSR;
- 1972-1995 – Professor at the Moscow Technological University (MIREA).

Feld died on August 28, 1995, in Moscow and was buried at the Preobrazhenskoe Jewish cemetery in St. Petersburg.

== Scientific activity ==
Feld was author of 3 monographs and over 200 scientific papers, the founder of a scientific school in the field of electrical engineering, closely worked with over 40 PhD graduates and 10 doctorate PhD graduates.

Feld was the founder and leader of the All-Moscow Seminar on "Diffraction and Wave Propagation" (that took place at the Institute of Radio-engineering and Electronics of the Russian Academy of Sciences). In 2002 that Seminar was renamed into the Moscow Feld's Seminar of Electrodynamics.

In 1956-1995 Feld was a member of the Editorial Board of a scientific journal "Radio-engineering and Electronics" of the USSR Academy of Sciences.

Feld left an extensive scientific legacy:

- Modern formulation of electromagnetic boundary value problems;
- Developed complete Theory of Slot Antennas;
- Developed direct methods for antennas, including the method of induced magneto-motive forces for the calculation of the fields in slots;
- Developed methods for solving diffraction problems on curved surfaces and screens (in particular, Feld's method of special orthogonalization, generalization of variational methods for the cases of nonselfadjoint operators and Hilbert metric);
- Developed methods for solving inverse problems of Antenna theory (Antenna Synthesis);
- Shown that the field of any antenna with a flat radiating aperture calculated by the known approximate method of equivalent currents from the tangent components of the field vectors given at the aperture is identical to the field calculated with assumption that the tangent components of the field vectors on aperture remain the same, and the aperture itself is supplemented to the infinite plane by a completely black flange. I. e. the widely used method of calculation of aperture antenna radiation patterns corresponds to a slightly different model with a black flange;
- Developed general formulas for the received by antenna power when a wave of arbitrary shape falls on it, taking into account the mismatch of the feeder with the antenna, it is shown that for a fixed incident field, the problem of the maximum of the received power does not make sense and the additional conditions under which this maximum exists and is finite are given, it is proved that in the presence of losses in the medium surrounding the antenna, this maximum exists without any additional conditions; Development of the Method of variation of constants for solving boundary value problems of partial differential equations, in particular for Maxwell's equations;
- Developed the theory of electromagnetic wave scattering by antennas.

Feld led the development of original designs of antennas with elliptical polarization, the surface wave antennas, waveguide slot and lens antennas, antennas with electrical swing beam, the axially symmetric broadband phased arrays.

== Monographs ==
- Feld Ya.N., Foundations of Slot Antenna Theory. – Moscow: Soviet Radio, 1948. – 164 pp. (In Russian)
- Feld Ya.N., Benenson L.S. Centimeter and decimeter wave antennas. – Moscow: Zhukovsky Air Force Academy, 1955. – 208 pp. (In Russian)
- Feld Ya.N., Benenson L.S. Antenna and feeder devices. – Moscow: Zhukovsky Air Force Academy, 1959. – 552 pp. (In Russian)
- Handbook on antennas, vol.1. – Moscow: IPRZhR, 1997. – 249 pp. (chapters 1, 2, 4, 6 и 3, last in cooperation with L.D. Bakhrah and E.G. Zelkin). ISBN 5-88070-003-8 (In Russian)
- Feld Ya.N., Benenson L.S. Antenna theory foundations. – Moscow: Drofa, 2007. – 492 pp. ISBN 978-5-358-01772-6 (In Russian)
- Feld Ya.N. Electromagnetics. Diffraction. Antennas. Scientific works. – Moscow: 2019 (electronic book). – 1006 pp. (In Russian)

== Sources ==
- Shifrin Ya. S., Kyurkchan A. G. Yakov Naumovich Feld. Creative way. – Radio engineering and electronics, 2012, part 57, No. 9, p. 943-947. ISSN 0033-8494
- Russian Jewish Encyclopedia.
