= Alexander Murray MacBeath =

English mathematician

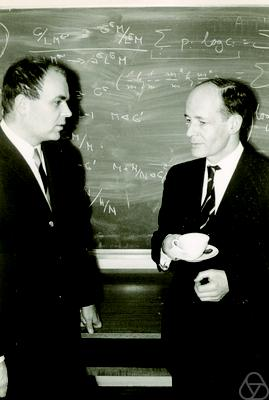
- Murray MacBeath (right) with Wilhelm Kaup
- Born: Alexander Murray MacBeath; 30 June 1923; Glasgow, Scotland
- Died: 14 May 2014 (aged 90); Warwick, England
- Education: Queens University, Belfast (B.A.); Clare College, Cambridge (M.A.); Princeton University (Ph.D., 1950)
- Occupations: mathematician, professor
- Known for: WWII codebreaking, MacBeath Surfaces, MacBeath Regions
- Spouse: Julie (1952-his death)
- Children: 2

Alexander Murray MacBeath (30 June 1923 Glasgow – 14 May 2014 Warwick) was a Scottish mathematician who worked on Riemann surfaces. MacBeath surfaces and MacBeath regions are named after him.

== Early life and education ==
MacBeath was the son of Alexander MacBeath, a philosopher and logician who took a position at Queen's University Belfast in 1925, soon after Murray was born. Murray also studied at Queen's University, earning a B.A. with honours in 1943.

During World War II, he worked in Hut 7 of the Government Code and Cypher School at Bletchley Park, breaking ciphers used for military communications by the Japanese navy and, later, the army.

He earned an M.A. (again with honours) from Clare College, Cambridge in 1948. With a Commonwealth Fund fellowship, he then attended Princeton University, where he earned his Ph.D. on "The Geometry of Non-Homogeneous Lattices" in 1950 under the supervision of Emil Artin.

== Career ==
He taught at Keele University and the University of Dundee before moving to the University of Birmingham in 1963 where he stayed until 1979 as Mason Professor. MacBeath then moved to the University of Pittsburgh in the United States until he reached their statutory retirement age of 60.

Following his retirement in the US, he took up another position at the University of Dundee where he remained for a number of years, before moving to Warwickshire where, at the University of Warwick, he held the position of emeritus professor of mathematics.

== Death ==
Professor MacBeath died on 14 May 2014 in Warwick, England.
