= Hannu Oja =

Finnish mathematical statistician (born 1950)

Hannu Frans Vilhelm Oja (born December 17, 1950, in Jämsä) is a Finnish mathematical statistician and biostatistician known for his contribution to nonparametric inference, robust statistics, and multivariate statistical methods. He introduced the Oja median for multivariate distributions.

== Education and career ==
Oja was born in Jämsä and studied in high school in Tampere (Tampereen klassillinen lyseo). He received his MSc in statistics at the University of Tampere in 1973 and his doctorate in 1981 at the University of Oulu under the supervision of Elja Arjas. Oja stayed on at the University of Oulu as a lecturer after his PhD. He later moved to Jyväskylä University. He was professor of biometrics at University of Tampere's Department of Health Sciences and an academy professor at the university from 2008 to 2012. He's current a professor in mathematics at University of Turku.

Oja has done research especially in the field of nonparametric statistical methods. He has also conducted applied statistical research in the fields of biometrics, signal processing, machine learning, and nutrition and health sciences. Oja became a fellow of the Institute of Mathematical Statistics in 2009.

== Bibliography ==
=== Books ===
- Oja, Hannu (2010). Multivariate Nonparametric Methods with R. Lecture Notes in Statistics. Vol. 199. New York, NY: Springer New York. doi:10.1007/978-1-4419-0468-3. ISBN 978-1-4419-0467-6.
- Shevlyakov, Georgy L.; Oja, Hannu (2016). Robust correlation : theory and applications. Chichester, West Sussex, United Kingdom. ISBN 978-1-119-26450-7. OCLC 948670989.

=== Reviews ===
- Oja, Hannu (1999). "Affine Invariant Multivariate Sign and Rank Tests and Corresponding Estimates: a Review". Scandinavian Journal of Statistics. 26 (3): 319–343. doi:10.1111/1467-9469.00152. ISSN 0303-6898. S2CID 120291806.
- Möttönen, Jyrki; Nordhausen, Klaus; Oja, Hannu (2010), "Asymptotic theory of the spatial median", Institute of Mathematical Statistics Collections, Beachwood, Ohio, USA: Institute of Mathematical Statistics, pp. 182–193, doi:10.1214/10-imscoll718, ISBN 978-0-940600-80-5
- Oja, Hannu (2012), "Descriptive statistics for nonparametric models. The impact of some Erich Lehmann's papers", in Rojo, Javier (ed.), Selected Works of E. L. Lehmann, Boston, MA: Springer US, pp. 451–457, doi:10.1007/978-1-4614-1412-4_40, ISBN 978-1-4614-1411-7
- Ilmonen, Pauliina; Oja, Hannu; Serfling, Robert (2012). "On Invariant Coordinate System (ICS) Functionals: On Invariant Coordinate System (ICS) Functionals". International Statistical Review. 80 (1): 93–110. doi:10.1111/j.1751-5823.2011.00163.x. hdl:10.1111/j.1751-5823.2011.00163.x. S2CID 18767091.
- Oja, Hannu (2013), "Multivariate Median", in Becker, Claudia; Fried, Roland; Kuhnt, Sonja (eds.), Robustness and Complex Data Structures, Berlin, Heidelberg: Springer Berlin Heidelberg, pp. 3–15, doi:10.1007/978-3-642-35494-6_1, ISBN 978-3-642-35493-9
- Nordhausen, Klaus; Oja, Hannu (2018-03-07). "Robust Nonparametric Inference". Annual Review of Statistics and Its Application. 5 (1): 473–500. Bibcode:2018AnRSA...5..473N. doi:10.1146/annurev-statistics-031017-100247. ISSN 2326-8298.
