= Lindeberg's condition =

Theorem from probability theory

In probability theory, Lindeberg's condition is a sufficient condition (and under certain conditions also a necessary condition) for the central limit theorem (CLT) to hold for a sequence of independent random variables. Unlike the classical CLT, which requires that the random variables in question have finite variance and be both independent and identically distributed, Lindeberg's CLT only requires that they have finite variance, satisfy Lindeberg's condition, and be independent. It is named after the Finnish mathematician Jarl Waldemar Lindeberg.

== Statement ==
Let $(\Omega, \mathcal{F}, \mathbb{P})$ be a probability space, and $X_k : \Omega \to \mathbb{R},\,\, k \in \mathbb{N}$, be independent random variables defined on that space. Assume the expected values $\mathbb{E}\,[X_k] = \mu_k$ and variances $\mathrm{Var}\,[X_k] = \sigma_k^2$ exist and are finite. Also let $s_n^2 := \sum_{k=1}^n \sigma_k^2 .$

If this sequence of independent random variables $X_k$ satisfies Lindeberg's condition:

$$\lim_{n \to \infty} \frac{1}{s_n^2}\sum_{k = 1}^n \mathbb{E} \left[(X_k - \mu_k)^2 \cdot \mathbf{1}_{\{ | X_k - \mu_k | > \varepsilon s_n \}} \right] = 0$$

for all $\varepsilon > 0$, where 1_{{…}} is the indicator function, then the central limit theorem holds, i.e. the random variables

$$Z_n := \frac{\sum_{k = 1}^n (X_k - \mu_k)}{s_n}$$

converge in distribution to a standard normal random variable as $n \to \infty.$

Lindeberg's condition is sufficient, but not in general necessary (i.e. the inverse implication does not hold in general). However, if the sequence of independent random variables in question satisfies

$$\max_{k=1,\ldots,n} \frac{\sigma_k^2}{s_n^2} \to 0, \quad \text{ as } n \to \infty,$$

then Lindeberg's condition is both sufficient and necessary, i.e. it holds if and only if the result of central limit theorem holds.

== Remarks ==
=== Feller's theorem ===
Feller's theorem can be used as an alternative method to prove that Lindeberg's condition holds. Letting $S_n := \sum_{k=1}^n X_k$ and for simplicity $\mathbb{E}\,[X_k] = 0$, the theorem states

if $\forall \varepsilon > 0$, $\lim_{n \rightarrow \infty} \max_{1 \leq k \leq n} P(|X_k| > \varepsilon s_n) = 0$ and $\frac{S_n}{s_n}$ converges weakly to a standard normal distribution as $n \rightarrow \infty$ then $X_k$ satisfies the Lindeberg's condition.

This theorem can be used to disprove the central limit theorem holds for $X_k$ by using proof by contradiction. This procedure involves proving that Lindeberg's condition fails for $X_k$.

== Interpretation ==
Because the Lindeberg condition implies $\max_{k=1,\ldots,n}\frac{\sigma^2_k}{s_n^2} \to 0$ as $n \to \infty$, it guarantees that the contribution of any individual random variable $X_k$ ($1\leq k\leq n$) to the variance $s_n^2$ is arbitrarily small, for sufficiently large values of $n$.

=== Example ===
Consider the following informative example which satisfies the Lindeberg condition. Let $\xi_i$ be a sequence of zero mean, variance 1 iid random variables and $a_i$ a non-random sequence satisfying:

$$\max_i^n \frac{|a_i|}{\|a\|_2} \rightarrow 0$$

Now, define the normalized elements of the linear combination:

$$X_{i} = \frac{a_i \xi_i}{\|a\|_2}$$

which satisfies the Lindeberg condition:

$$\sum_{i=1}^n \mathbb E \left [ \left | X_i\right |^2 1(|X_i| > \varepsilon)\right ] \leq \sum_{i=1}^n \mathbb E \left [ \left | X_i\right |^2 1 \left(|\xi_i| > \varepsilon \frac{\|a\|_2}{\max_i^n |a_i|} \right)\right ] = \sum_{i=1}^{n}
\mathbb E \left [ \left | \xi_i\right |^2 1 \left(|\xi_i| > \varepsilon \frac{\|a\|_2}{\max_i^n |a_i|} \right)\right ]$$

but $\xi_i^2$ is finite so by DCT and the condition on the $a_i$ we have that this goes to 0 for every $\varepsilon$.

== See also ==
- Lyapunov condition
- Central limit theorem
