= Elja Arjas =

Finnish mathematician and statistician (born 1943)

Elja Arjas (born February 9, 1943, in Tampere) is a Finnish mathematician and statistician. He is professor emeritus at the University of Helsinki.

== Education and career ==
Arjas studied mathematics at the University of Helsinki and graduated with a bachelor's degree in philosophy in 1964. He graduated with a licentiate in mathematics and statistics in 1970 and received his doctorate in mathematics in 1972, under the supervision of Olli Lokki and Gustav Elfving. He was a research fellow at the Center for Operations Research and Econometrics at the Université catholique de Louvain until 1973, before moving back to Finland.

Arjas was a professor of applied mathematics and statistics at the University of Oulu between 1975 and 1997. Between 1992 and 1997, he worked as an academy professor at the Academy of Finland, and from 1997 to 2009 as a part-time professor of biometrics at the University of Helsinki and as a research professor at the Institute of Health and Welfare. Arjas was a visiting professor at the University of British Columbia between 1978 and 1979, a visiting professor at the University of Washington and the Fred Hutchinson Cancer Research Center from 1984 to 1985.

== Honors and awards ==
Arjas was elected a fellow of the International Statistical Institute in 1977, a fellow of the a member of the Institute of Mathematical Statistics in 1982, and a member of the Finnish Academy of Sciences in 2001. He received an honorary doctorate from the University of Oulu in 2006.
