= Random polytope =

Mathematical object

In mathematics, a random polytope is a structure commonly used in convex analysis and the analysis of linear programs in d-dimensional Euclidean space $\R^d$. Depending on use the construction and definition, random polytopes may differ.

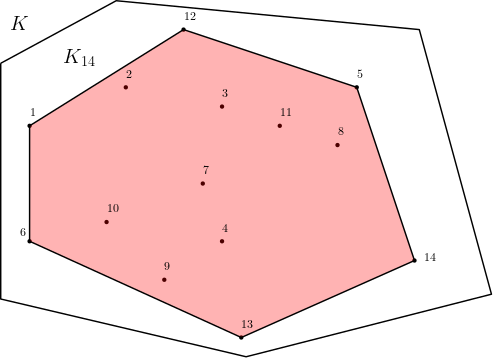
Random polytope of a set of random points in accordance with definition 1

== Definition ==
There are multiple non equivalent definitions of a Random polytope. For the following definitions. Let K be a bounded convex set in a Euclidean space:

- The convex hull of random points selected with respect to a uniform distribution inside K.
- The nonempty intersection of half-spaces in $\R^d$.
  - The following parameterization has been used: $r:(\R^d \times \{0,1\})^m\rightarrow \text{Polytopes} \in \R^d$ such that $r((p_1, 0), (p_2, 1), (p_3, 1)...(p_m, i_m)) = \{x \in \R^n: | \frac{p_j}{||p_j||} \cdot x \leq ||p_j|| \text{ if } i_j=1, \frac{p_j}{||p_j||} \cdot x \geq ||p_j|| \text{ if } i_j=0 \}$ (Note: these polytopes can be empty).

=== Properties definition 1 ===
Let $\Kappa$ be the set of convex bodies in $\R^d$. Assume $K \in\Kappa$ and consider a set of uniformly distributed points $x_1, ..., x_n$ in $K$. The convex hull of these points, $K_n$, is called a random polytope inscribed in $K$. $K_n = [x_1, ..., x_n]$ where the set $[S]$ stands for the convex hull of the set. We define $E(k,n)$ to be the expected volume of $K - K_n$. For a large enough $n$ and given $K \in \R^n$.

- vol $K(\frac{1}{n})\ll E(K,n) \ll$ vol $K(\frac{1}{n})$
  - Note: One can determine the volume of the wet part to obtain the order of the magnitude of $E(K,n)$, instead of determining $E(K,n)$.
- For the unit ball $B^d \in \R^d$, the wet part $B^d(v \leq t)$ is the annulus $\frac{B^d}{(1-h)B^d}$ where h is of order $t^{\frac{2}{d+1}}$: $E(B^d,n) \approx$ vol $B^d (\frac{1}{n}) \approx n^{\frac{-2}{d+1}}$

Given we have $V = V(x_1,...,x_d)$ is the volume of a smaller cap cut off from $K$ by aff$(x_1,...,x_d)$, and $F=[x_1,...,x_d]$ is a facet if and only if $x_{d+1},...,x_n$ are all on one side of aff $\{x_1,...,x_d\}$.

- $E_{\phi}(K_n) = {{n}\choose{d}} \int_K ... \int_K [(1-V)^{n-d} + V^{n-d}]\phi(F)dx_1...dx_d$.
  - Note: If $\phi = f_{d-1}$ (a function that returns the amount of d-1 dimensional faces), then $\phi(F) = 1$ and formula can be evaluated for smooth convex sets and for polygons in the plane.

=== Properties definition 2 ===
Assume we are given a multivariate probability distribution on $(\R^d \times \{ 0, 1\})^m=(p_1\times i_1,\dots,p_m\times i_m)^m$ that is

1. Absolutely continuous on $(p_1,\dots,p_d)$ with respect to Lebesgue measure.
2. Generates either 0 or 1 for the $i$s with probability of $\frac{1}{2}$ each.
3. Assigns a measure of 0 to the set of elements in $(\R^d \times \{ 0, 1\})^m$ that correspond to empty polytopes.

Given this distribution, and our assumptions, the following properties hold:

- A formula is derived for the expected number of $k$ dimensional faces on a polytope in $\R^d$ with $m$ constraints: $E_k(m) = 2^{d-k} \sum_{i = d - k}^{d}{{i}\choose{d-k}}{{m}\choose{i}}/\sum_{i=0}^{d}{{m}\choose{i}}$. (Note: $\lim_{m \to \infty}E_k(m) = {{d}\choose{d-k}}2^{d-k}$ where $m>d$). The upper bound, or worst case, for the number of vertices with $m$ constraints is much larger: $V_{max} = {m-[\frac{1}{2}(d+1)]\choose m-d} + {m-[\frac{1}{2}(d+2)]\choose m-d}$.
- The probability that a new constraint is redundant is: $\pi_{m} = 1 - \frac{2\sum_{i=0}^{d-1}{{m-1}\choose i}}{\sum_{i=0}^{d}{m\choose i}}$. (Note: $\lim_{m \to \infty}{\pi_m} = 1$, and as we add more constraints, the probability a new constraint is redundant approaches 100%).
- The expected number of non-redundant constraints is: $C_d(m) = \frac{2m\sum_{i=0}^{d-1}{{m-1}\choose i}}{\sum_{i=0}^{d}{{m}\choose i}}$. (Note: $\lim_{m \to \infty}C_d(m) = 2d$).

== Example uses ==
- Minimal caps
- Macbeath regions
- Approximations (approximations of convex bodies see properties of definition 1)
- Economic cap covering theorem (see relation from properties of definition 1 to floating bodies)
