= Jarl Waldemar Lindeberg =

Finnish mathematician (1876–1932)

Jarl Waldemar Lindeberg (4 August 1876, Helsinki – 24 December 1932, Helsinki) was a Finnish mathematician known for work on the central limit theorem.

== Life and work ==
Lindeberg was son of a teacher at the Helsinki Polytechnical Institute and at an early age showed mathematical talent and interest. The family was well off and later Jarl Waldemar would prefer to be a reader than a full professor. Lindeberg's career centred on the University of Helsinki. His early interests were in partial differential equations and the calculus of variations but from 1920 he worked in probability and statistics. In 1920 he published his first paper on the central limit theorem. His result was similar to that obtained earlier by Lyapunov whose work he did not then know. However, their approaches were quite different; Lindeberg's was based on a convolution argument while Lyapunov used the characteristic function. Two years later Lindeberg used his method to obtain a stronger result: the so-called Lindeberg condition. His work on probability led to him becoming involved in applied fields. He developed what we know as Kendall's τ and he found the first two moments of its sampling distribution. Lindeberg used line transect methods in forestry, and when in 1926 determining the necessary number of transects to obtain a sufficiently precise confidence interval, he seems to have rediscovered Student's t-distribution.

The Swedish mathematician Harald Cramér met Lindeberg in 1922. He later recalled this story about Lindeberg and the beautiful farm he owned. "When he was reproached for not being sufficiently active in his scientific work, he said 'Well, I am really a farmer.' And if somebody happened to say that his farm was not properly cultivated, his answer was 'Of course my real job is to be a professor.' I was very fond of him and saw him often during the following years."

Lindeberg's work was unknown to Alan Turing, who proved the central limit theorem in his dissertation in 1935.

== Writing available on the web ==
- Lindeberg, J. W. (1922). "Eine neue Herleitung des Exponentialgesetzes in der Wahrscheinlichkeitsrechnung". Mathematische Zeitschrift. 15 (1): 211–225. doi:10.1007/BF01494395. S2CID 119730242.

== Commentary ==
- Le Cam, L. (1986). "The Central Limit Theorem around 1935". Statistical Science. 1 (1): 78–91. doi:10.1214/ss/1177013818. JSTOR 2245503.
- Elfving, Gustav (1981). The History of Mathematics in Finland 1828–1918. Helsinki: Societas Scientarium Fennica. ISBN 951-653-098-2.

== Biography ==
- Elfving, G. (2001). "Jarl Waldemar Lindeberg". In Heyde, C. C.; Seneta, E. (eds.). Statisticians of the Centuries. New York: Springer. pp. 318–321. ISBN 0-387-95283-7.
- Cramér, Harald (1976). "Half a Century with Probability Theory: Some Personal Recollections". Annals of Probability. 4 (4): 509–546. doi:10.1214/aop/1176996025.
