= Stationary sequence =

Random sequence whose joint probability distribution is invariant over time

In probability theory – specifically in the theory of stochastic processes, a stationary sequence is a random sequence whose joint probability distribution is invariant over time. If a random sequence X_{j} is stationary then the following holds:

$$\begin{align}
& {} \quad F_{X_n,X_{n+1},\dots,X_{n+N-1}}(x_n, x_{n+1},\dots,x_{n+N-1}) \\
& = F_{X_{n+k},X_{n+k+1},\dots,X_{n+k+N-1}}(x_n, x_{n+1},\dots,x_{n+N-1}),
\end{align}$$

where F is the joint cumulative distribution function of the random variables in the subscript.

If a sequence is stationary then it is wide-sense stationary.

If a sequence is stationary then it has a constant mean (which may not be finite):

$$E(X[n]) = \mu \quad \text{for all } n .$$

== See also ==
- Stationary process
