= Hilbert metric =

Distance function

In mathematics, the Hilbert metric, also known as the Hilbert projective metric, is an explicitly defined distance function on a bounded convex subset of the n-dimensional Euclidean space R^{n}. It was introduced by David Hilbert (1895) as a generalization of Cayley's formula for the distance in the Cayley–Klein model of hyperbolic geometry, where the convex set is the n-dimensional open unit ball. Hilbert's metric has been applied to Perron–Frobenius theory and to constructing Gromov hyperbolic spaces.

== Definition ==
Let Ω be a convex open domain in a Euclidean space that does not contain a line. Given two distinct points A and B of Ω, let X and Y be the points at which the straight line AB intersects the boundary of Ω, where the order of the points is X, A, B, Y. Then the Hilbert distance d(A, B) is the logarithm of the cross-ratio of this quadruple of points:

$$d(A,B)=\log\left(\frac{|YA|}{|YB|}\frac{|XB|}{|XA|}\right).$$

The function d is extended to all pairs of points by letting d(A, A) = 0 and defines a metric on Ω. If one of the points A and B lies on the boundary of Ω then d can be formally defined to be +∞, corresponding to a limiting case of the above formula when one of the denominators is zero.

A variant of this construction arises for a closed convex cone K in a Banach space V (possibly, infinite-dimensional). In addition, the cone K is assumed to be pointed, i.e. K ∩ (−K) = {0} and thus K determines a partial order $\leq_K$ on V. Given any vectors v and w in K ∖{0}, one first defines

$$M(v/w)=\inf\{\lambda:v\leq_K\lambda w\}, \quad m(v/w)=\sup\{\mu:\mu w \leq_K v\}.$$

The Hilbert pseudometric on K ∖{0} is then defined by the formula

$$d(v,w)=\log\frac{M(v/w)}{m(v/w)}.$$

It is invariant under the rescaling of v and w by positive constants and so descends to a metric on the space of rays of K, which is interpreted as the projectivization of K (in order for d to be finite, one needs to restrict to the interior of K). Moreover, if K ⊂ R × V is the cone over a convex set Ω,

$$K=\{(t,tx): t\in\mathbb{R}, x\in\Omega \},$$

then the space of rays of K is canonically isomorphic to Ω. If v and w are vectors in rays in K corresponding to the points A, B ∈ Ω then these two formulas for d yield the same value of the distance.

== Examples ==
- In the case where the domain Ω is a unit ball in R^{n}, the formula for d coincides with the expression for the distance between points in the Cayley–Klein model of hyperbolic geometry, up to a multiplicative constant.
- If the cone K is the positive orthant in R^{n} then the induced metric on the projectivization of K is often called simply Hilbert's projective metric. This cone corresponds to a domain Ω which is a regular simplex of dimension n − 1.

== Motivation and applications ==
- Hilbert introduced his metric in order to construct an axiomatic metric geometry in which there exist triangles ABC whose vertices A, B, C are not collinear, yet one of the sides is equal to the sum of the other two — it follows that the shortest path connecting two points is not unique in this geometry. In particular, this happens when the convex set Ω is a Euclidean triangle and the straight line extensions of the segments AB, BC, AC do not meet the interior of one of the sides of Ω.
- Garrett Birkhoff used Hilbert's metric and the Banach contraction principle to rederive the Perron–Frobenius theorem in finite-dimensional linear algebra and its analogues for integral operators with positive kernels. Birkhoff's ideas have been further developed and used to establish various nonlinear generalizations of the Perron-Frobenius theorem, which have found significant uses in computer science, mathematical biology, game theory, dynamical systems theory, and ergodic theory.
- Generalizing earlier results of Anders Karlsson and Guennadi Noskov, Yves Benoist determined a system of necessary and sufficient conditions for a bounded convex domain in R^{n}, endowed with its Hilbert metric, to be a Gromov hyperbolic space.
- C. Vernicos and C. Walsh showed that balls in the Hilbert Metric and asymptotic balls are approximately equivalent up to constant factors.
- C. Vernicos and C. Walsh, then expanded upon by David Mount and Ahmed Abdelkader, showed that balls in the Hilbert Metric and Macbeath regions are approximately equivalent up to constant factors.
