= Heliograph (disambiguation) =

Heliograph may refer to:

- Heliograph, tripod-mounted mirrors used as solar telegraphs
- Daylight signalling mirror, also known as a heliograph in British English, handheld mirror to reflect sunlight as a distress signal
- Sunshine recorder, also known as a heliograph, a device that records the amount of sunlight at a given location
- Solar telescope, also known as a heliograph or photoheliograph, a telescope especially adapted for viewing the surface of the Sun
- Heliography, the photographic process used to make the earliest known permanent photograph from nature
- Heliographic coordinate system, a type of coordinate system used to identify locations on the Sun's surface
