= Operation On-Target =

Scouting signaling task using mirrors

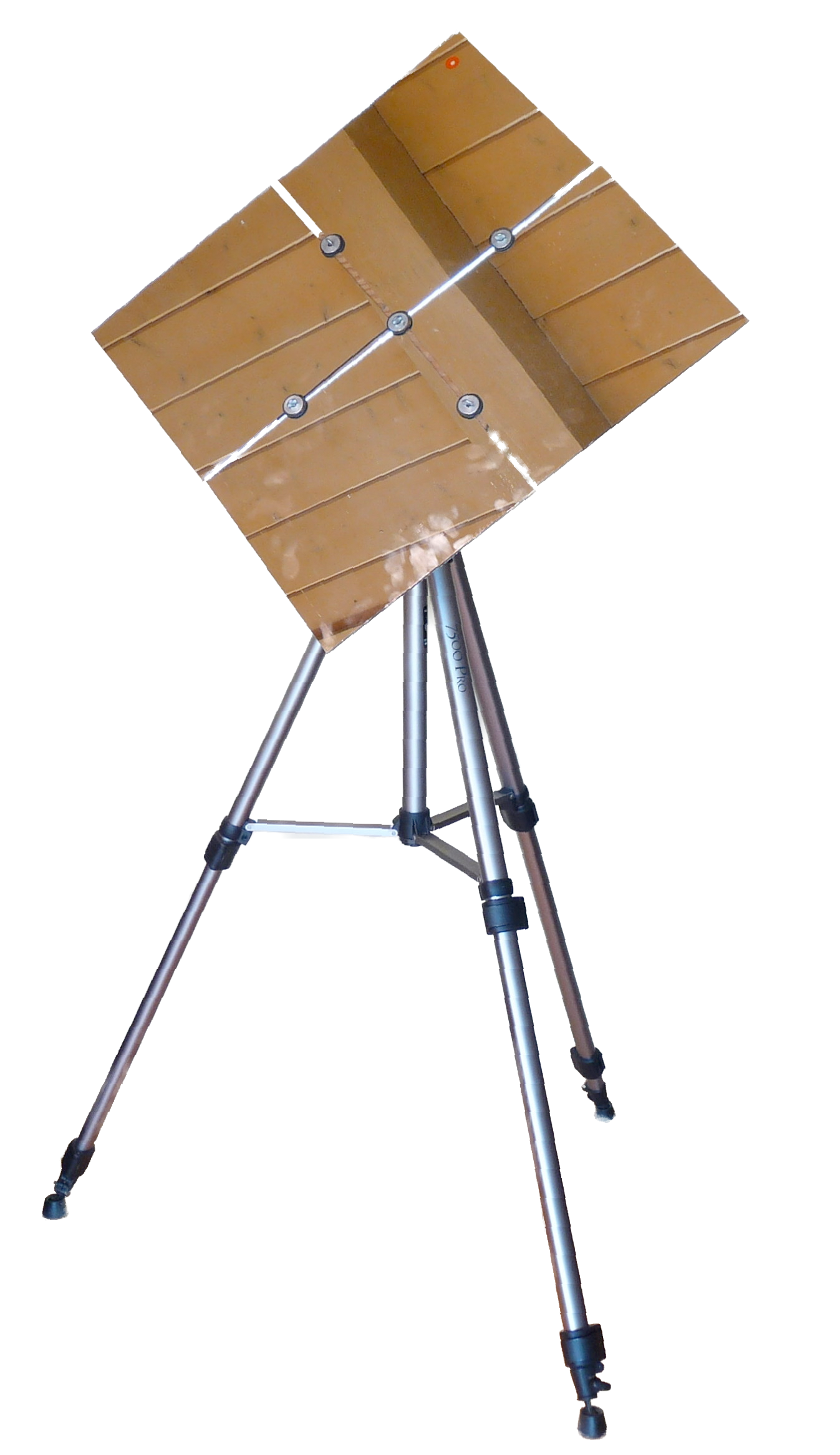
Fig. 1: The classic large Operation On-Target mirror

Operation On-Target is a high adventure Scouting activity. It was created as a Varsity Scout program activity, open to Venturers and older Boy Scouts. It has continued since the disbanding of the Varsity Scout program at the end of 2017. The event is mainly held in the western United States, but has included Hawaii and New York. The basic idea is to have Scouts scattered across a particular area, located on mountain peaks or other prominent points within line of sight of each other. Using large signaling mirrors, they relay messages from peak to peak. Success in the event depends on team skills such as map-reading, compass skills, mirror-building, mirror signaling and teamwork. Many units spend time in the weeks or months before the actual event learning communications skills like ham radio and signaling. Reaching the peak can also be a challenge, requiring the boys to practice hiking, camping, and backpacking skills. They also need to consider what they will do if the clouds block the sun.

== Background ==
According to Doug Brewer, its founder, the name "Operation On-Target" was chosen at its inception in 1980 because the "purpose of the experience was to get the Scouts on target with the Varsity Scout program, and on target on the peaks with mirrors".

Two main goals are to establish a signal link from the Mexico–US border to the Canada–US border, and to make a link from the Pacific Ocean to at least the continental divide. The event has been annual since 1981. As many as 5,000 scouts have participated in a single year, with participation from Utah, Arizona, Wyoming, Idaho, Nevada, California, Oregon and Washington, from Puget Sound in Washington to Catalina Island and San Diego in California.

The annual event is held on the third Saturday in July and September. Areas with warmer climates typically see larger turnout on the latter date.

A manual for this event was developed by the Great Salt Lake Council, was later reprinted in one of the Varsity Scout Program Helps books, and became a chapter in the Boy Scouts of America Varsity Team Features Volume II handbook. While even small handheld mirrors, 3" to 4" on a side, can be seen 30 miles away, teams are encouraged to take along at least one large mirror. The classic large Operation On-Target signal mirror is a modular design with four square feet of reflecting area, transported in backpacks and assembled on-site. It consists of four 12"x12" mirrors bolted to a square of plywood with wing bolts and mounted on a light tripod. A small aimable signal mirror is taped to one edge as a sight.

== Early beginnings ==
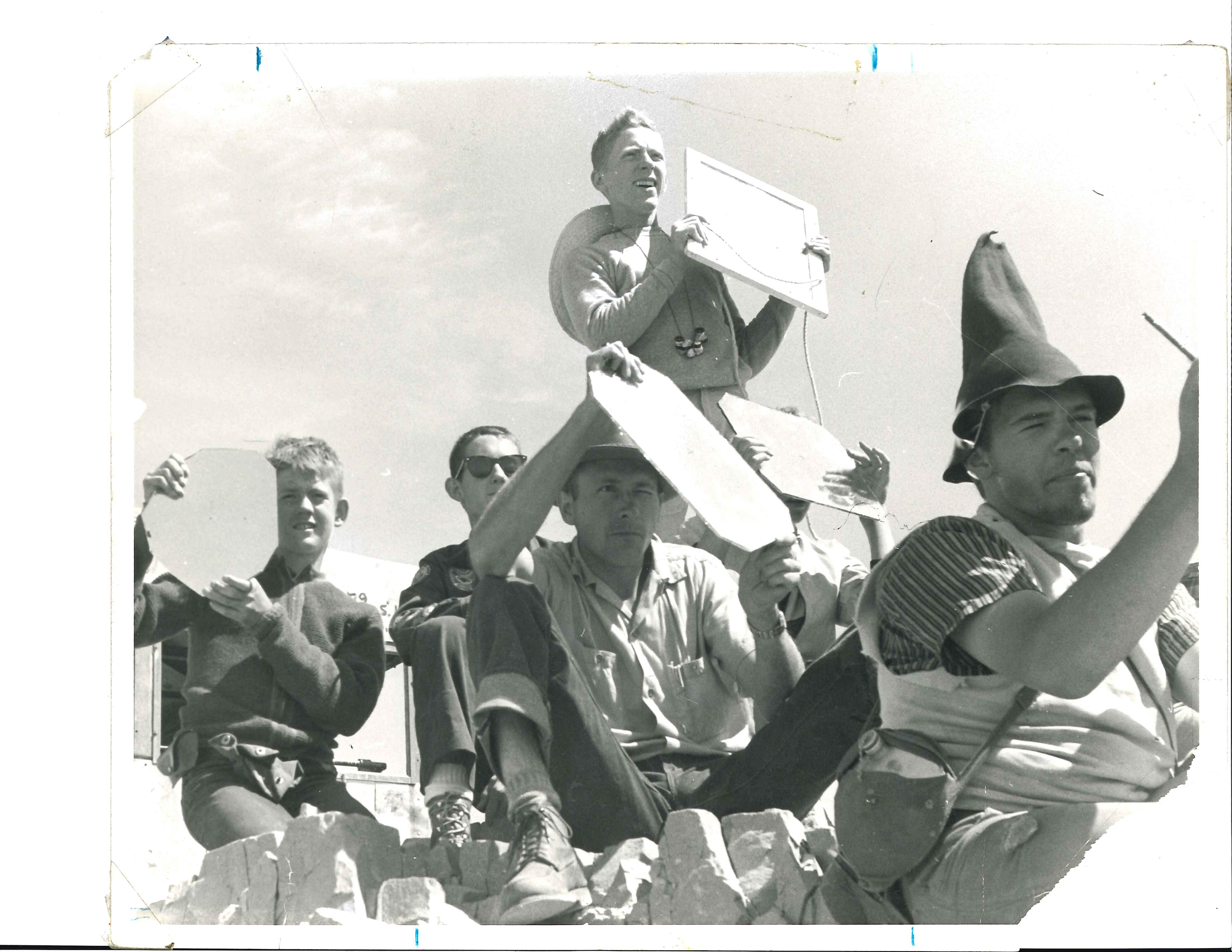
Explorer Scouts using mirrors to send signals from Mt. Timpanogos to residents of Utah Valley below. Photo by Glannin A. Cloward

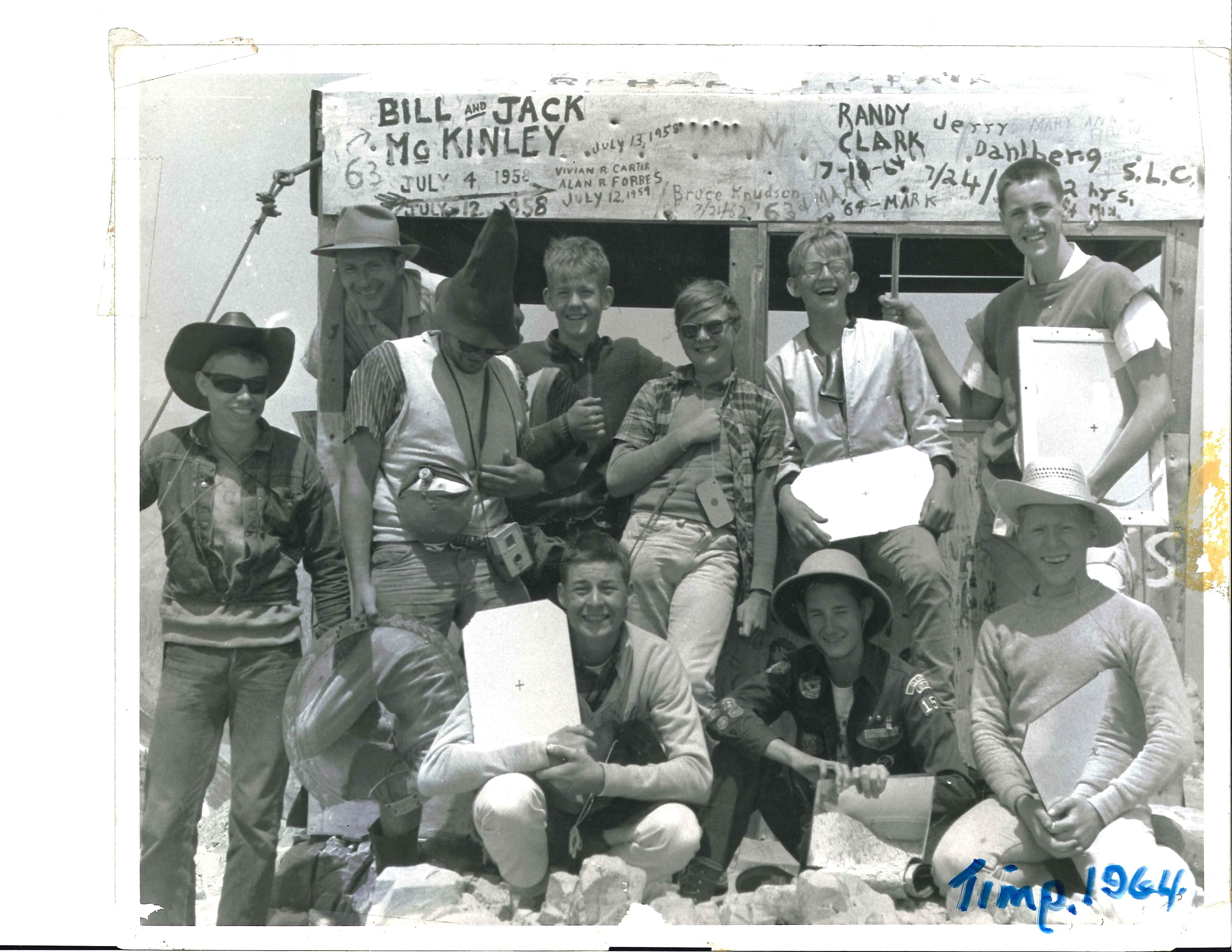
Scouts with mirrors at Mt. Timpanogos, 1964. Photo by Glannin A. Cloward

Operation On-Target was foreshadowed by the 1964–1965 "Signal Festival" organized by Glannin A. Cloward, a former U.S. Air Force pilot and World War II veteran. In 1964 Mr. Cloward led a group of 10 Explorer Scouts from Post 156 (Clearfield, Utah) to the top of Mt. Timpanogos; from there they flashed signals (reflected sunlight) down to the inhabitants of Utah Valley using pieces of old mirrors from which Mr. Cloward had created signal mirrors patterned after those carried in military aircraft survival kits. Several dozen local residents, seeing bright flashes from the peak, improvised return signals using household mirrors from locations around the valley approximately 5 to 25 miles away. The following year a peak-to-peak signaling event was attempted between five peaks in northern Utah, but due to bad weather and inadequate planning communication was successful only between two of the five peaks. Mr. Cloward organized similar activities involving one to three scout units multiple times from 1965 to 1979 from various mountain peaks in central and northern Utah. In 1980 Mr. Douglas G. Brewer, Varsity Scout commissioner for the Great Salt Lake Council, and several other Scout Leaders built upon Mr. Cloward's experience to create Operation On-Target as a well coordinated, multi-council, multi-state activity in the nascent Varsity Scouting program.

== See also ==
- Heliograph
