= Varsity Scouting =

Former Boy Scouts of America program

- Owner: Boy Scouts of America
- Age range: 14 to 18 years
- Country: United States
- Founded: 1984
- Defunct: 2017
- Membership: 62,902 youth (2013); 22,915 adults (2013); 8,299 teams (2013)
Previous; Boy Scouting	Next; Venturing; Sea Scouting
- Website; Program information
- Standard uniform colors for Boy Scouting

Varsity Scouting was a program of the Boy Scouts of America (BSA). It was an alternative available to boys ages fourteen to eighteen until the end of 2017. It used the basic Boy Scouting program and added high adventure, sporting, and other elements that were more appealing to older youth to accomplish the aims of character development, citizenship training, and personal fitness. Varsity Scouts were organized into teams; separate chartered units from a Boy Scout troop.

Varsity Scouts participated in the BSA advancement system for troops but also had their own recognition. Their uniform was slightly different. Rather than using the dark green shoulder loops on the epaulets, orange loops were used and the position patches followed a sports team theme (Coach was used rather than Scoutmaster).

== Ideals ==
The Varsity Scout ideals were those spelled out in the Scout Law, the Scout Oath, the Scout Motto, and the Scout Slogan. The Varsity Scout learned to use these ideals as a measure of personal growth and continually tries to improve.

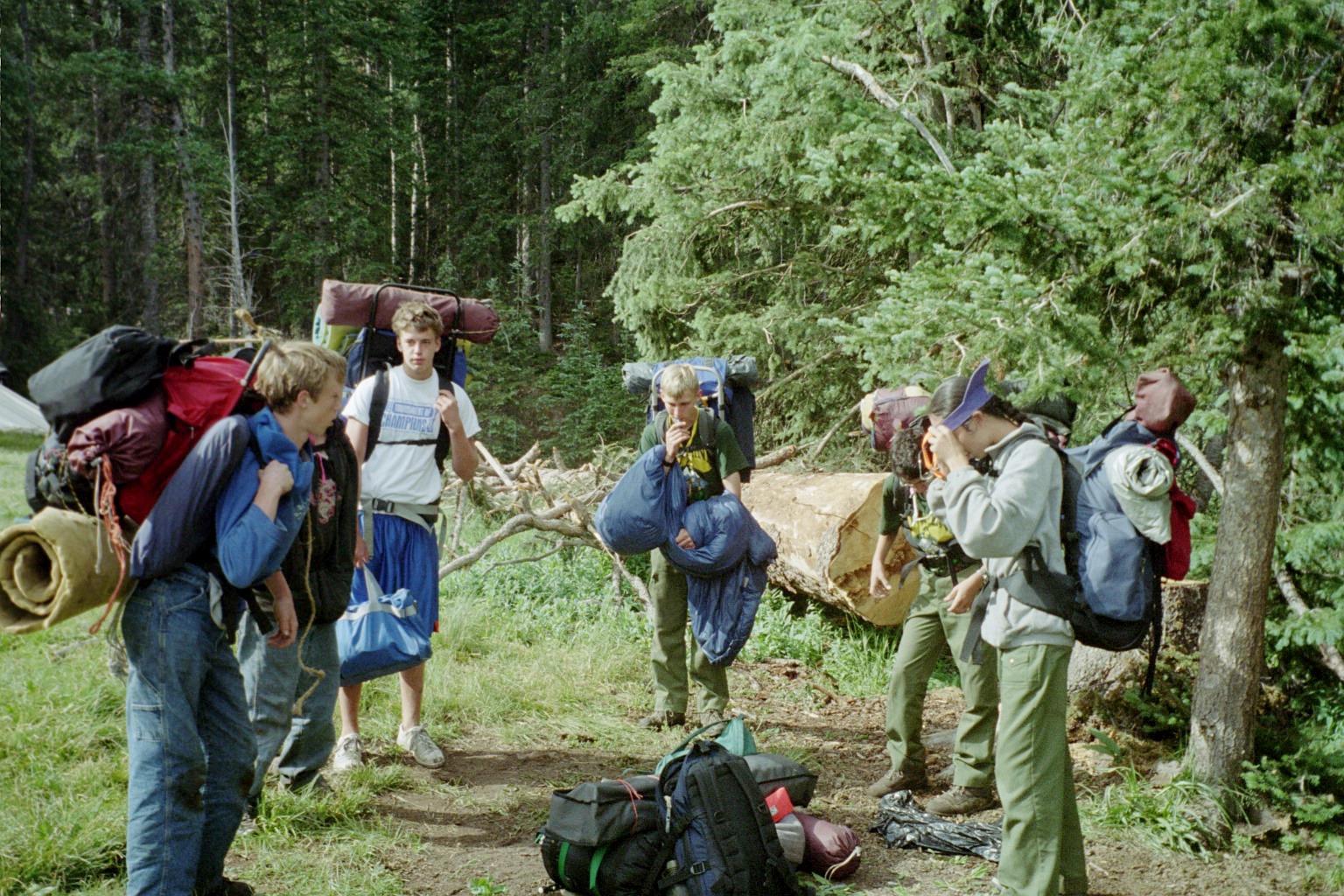
Varsity Scouts about to go backpacking

Varsity Scouting had five fields of emphasis. A well-planned Varsity Scout program included elements from all of the fields of emphasis:

Advancement Varsity Scouts used the same advancement program as Boy Scouts. They could also receive the recognition offered through such programs as the Fifty-Miler Award; Mile Swim, BSA; etc.

High Adventure and Sports. The basic framework for Varsity Scout activities revolved around high adventure and sports. Resource materials were available for 27 program features. The intent of this emphasis was to encourage a coherently planned set of activities that led to occasional "ultimate adventures" or sports seasons. Following the original model, teams were encouraged to plan a set of activities quarterly that culminate in some type of big event.

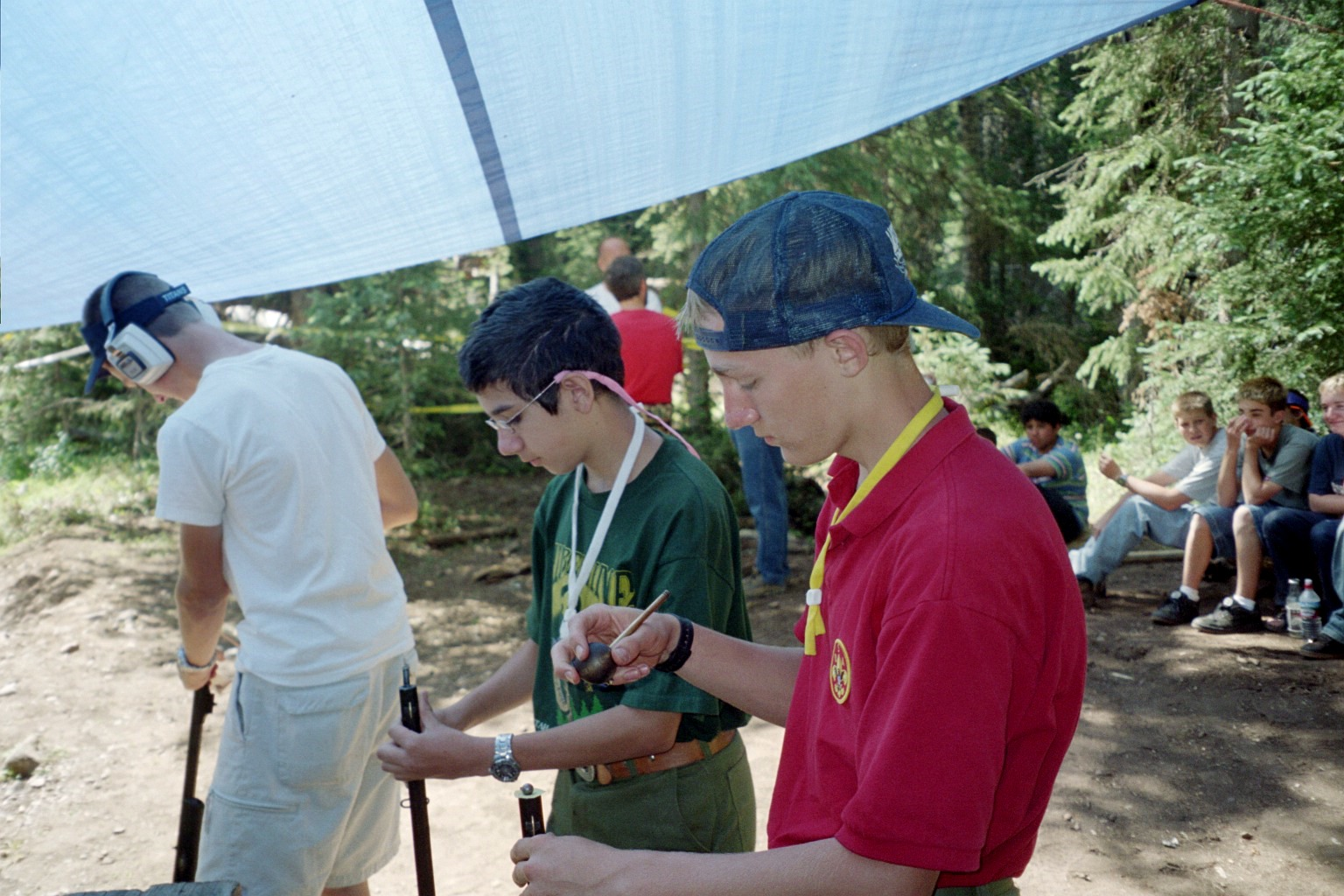
Varsity Scouts of the Boy Scouts of America learning about muzzle-loading rifles

Personal Development. "Varsity Scouting promotes growth through spirituality, leadership abilities, citizenship, social and cultural attributes, and physical fitness." The personal development side of Varsity encouraged boys to focus on character development within the framework of their personal and religious beliefs. A particular focus on leadership skills was evident in many teams.

Service is an essential element of all Scouting, as emphasized in the Boy Scout slogan: "Do a good turn daily." An element of service should be present in all Varsity Scout activities. For example, a sports unit could include a clinic for a nearby Cub Scout pack. It was important that the boys were to be the ones that plan, manage, and conduct the service activities.

Special Programs and Events. As part of their programs, Varsity Scouts were encouraged to incorporate special programs and events on a regular basis. These could include district, council, regional, and national events as well as joint activities with neighboring teams or other groups, including activities involving girls of similar age.

Varsity Scouting shared the Aims and Methods of Scouting.

== History ==
=== Origins ===
Varsity Scouting was the brainchild of Dr. J. D. Mortensen, a prominent thoracic and cardiovascular surgeon in Salt Lake City, Utah, and an influential member of the Boy Scouts of America. He served for 13 years on the Church of Jesus Christ of Latter-day Saints' Young Men Mutual Improvement Association (YMMIA) General Board and for several years as chairman of its General Scout Committee. He wrote numerous manuals and supplements for the YMMIA. He served on the faculty at the Philmont Scout Ranch in New Mexico, as advancement chairman for the Great Salt Lake Council, and as a chaplain at four national Scout jamborees, and was a recipient of the Silver Beaver Award, Silver Antelope Award, and the Silver Beehive Award for his work in Scouting.

=== Program development ===
Dr. Mortensen formed a Task Force to develop a Scouting program for 14- to 15-year-old young men in 1975. He asked five other men to assist him in his effort, namely:

- Alva D. Greene, President of Area 2 in the BSA's Western Region
- Ross J. Taylor, Executive Director of Area 2
- Boyd R. Ivie, Scout Executive of the Great Salt Lake Council
- Burton F. Brasher, Former member of the YMMIA General Board
- Verl L. Stark, Area 2 Wood Badge Coordinator

The Task Force labored to identify a program theme that would appeal to the young men in the targeted age group. They wanted a program that would encourage the young man to continue along the trail to Eagle, but one that would also encourage "bigger" and more challenging activities. They wanted it to be Scouting, but a version that would be viewed to be different from traditional Scouting. They wanted it to be more advanced, one that would hold the interest of a young man entering High School, a more "Senior" version of Scouting.

While driving together on their way to a Scouting function in Pocatello, Idaho, Dr. Mortensen proposed they call their program "Varsity Scouting". The name fit. Everyone in the car knew that it satisfied their requirements perfectly and the name was adopted on the spot. The unit would be called a "Team", the adult leader a "Coach", and the principal youth leader a "Captain". An award, the Varsity Scout Letter, was designated as the top award for Varsity Scouts.

The Task Force divided responsibility for developing various sections of the program among themselves. Over the course of about a month, each section was completed and brought back to the group for review. Comments were made and a common vision emerged. Once the initial program design was finished, they began putting a plan together for moving forward.

The Task Force selected the colors [orange and brown], designed the uniforms [a tan polo shirt with a brown collar], and began the work of developing literature. No financial support was available from the National Council. None was offered from the Church. Dr. Mortensen paid the bulk of the costs that were required to get the program off of the ground. The total sum he paid is unknown, but it is generally accepted to have been tens of thousands of dollars.

Under the original program, Varsity Scouts were not allowed to wear the field uniform of tradition Boy Scouting. Lynn Larsen, wife of Professional Scouter Doug Larsen, and June Weise sewed the first Varsity Scout uniforms. Despite the name, Varsity Scouting was never intended to be a strictly sports-oriented program. The organizers wanted to include athletics as a part of the program, but they also wanted to include outdoor high-adventure and ample opportunities for service.

The Program Manager position was created to provide leadership opportunities to the young men and to allow a means of providing administrative oversight to various aspects of Team management. Serving at the pleasure of the Team Captain, each Program Manager was made responsible for one of five fields of emphasis. The Team Committee structure was designed to parallel that of the Team itself. An adult serving on the Team Committee was expected to serve alongside each of the individual Program Managers in a supporting role.

==== Operation On-Target ====
Operation On-Target events were now synonymous with Varsity Scouting. In the spring of 1973, the Great Salt Lake Council held a "Merit Badge Expo" at the University of Utah. Commissioner Glen Oliver had the idea to send a Boy Scout Troop to the top of nearby Mount Olympus with a signaling mirror. At a predetermined time, the Scouts would signal the Expo as a demonstration to go along with the Signaling merit badge being offered. Doug Brewer was Scoutmaster of Boy Scout Troop 502, the unit that conducted this first mirror signaling activity that would later be adopted by Varsity Scouting and known as "Operation On Target" (to help Scouts "get on target with Varsity Scouting and on target in life)". Brewer later became the first Varsity Scouting commissioner in the Great Salt Lake Council.

=== Piloting ===
The Task Force sought the endorsement of both the LDS Church and the BSA. The Church's General Scouting Committee decided to recommend the Varsity Scouting program "with some reservations". However, the Presidency of the Young Men grew increasingly uneasy and asked for a delay in implementation. New materials developed by the Church to support the Aaronic Priesthood Quorums had been developed and were about to be released. They felt that a simultaneous introduction of the Varsity Scouting program and the Aaronic Priesthood materials would "muscle the quorum program into the background" and that "the expectations made of the local leaders will become complicated beyond their capacity". They went on to put forth an alternative plan that did not involve Varsity Scouting.

Eventually, approval was obtained from the Church to move forward with the program on a trial basis. The BSA was unwilling to embrace the program and offered no support of any kind for it, but they agreed to allow it to be piloted on a limited basis and approved the program design. Materials to support the program, the first Varsity Scout Handbook for the boys and a Leader Guidebook for the adults, were released.

The pre-pilot program was conducted from January 1978 to January 1980 within Area 2 of the Western Region. The participating Councils were Cache Valley, Logan, UT; Great Salt Lake, Salt Lake City, UT; Lake Bonneville, Ogden, UT; Snake River, Twin Falls, ID; Tendoy Area, Pocatello, ID; Teton Peaks, Idaho Falls, ID; and Utah National Parks, Provo, UT.

After a successful pre-pilot program, both the Varsity Scout Handbook for the boys and the Leader Guidebook were revised, creating second editions of each volume.

Piloting brought with it change to the uniform. The original polo shirt with the brown collar was modified, changing the shirt to a single-color, all-tan version. The Varsity Scout Emblem originally used was changed to a stitched logo using orange thread. Later still, when the new Boy Scout uniform designed by Oscar De La Renta was introduced, Varsity Scouting adopted the new uniform design, substituting the red shoulder loops designated for Boy Scouting with blaze orange shoulder loops for Varsity Scouting.

The National Council was persuaded to begin piloting the program on a broader scale. Twenty-eight councils were selected for this round of testing and National piloted the program from January 1980 to January 1984. The participating councils in this round were:
Aloha, Honolulu, HI; Anthony Wayne Area, Fort Wayne, IN; Baltimore Area, Baltimore, MD; Bay-Lakes, Menasha, WI; Cache Valley, Logan, UT; Chief Seattle, Seattle, WA; Del-Mar-Va, Wilmington, DE; Evergreen, Everett, WA; Great Salt Lake, Salt Lake City, UT; Great Western, Van Nuys, CA; Jim Bridger, Rock Springs, WY; Lake Bonneville, Ogden, UT; Longhorn, Fort Worth, TX; Los Angeles Area, Los Angeles, CA; Minsi Trails, Lehigh Valley, PA; Mount Rainier, Tacoma, WA; National Capital Area, Washington, D.C.; Ore-Ida, Boise, ID; Otetiana, Rochester, NY; Quivira, Wichita, KS; San Gabriel Valley, Pasadena, CA; Snake River Area, Twin Falls, ID; Tendoy Area, Pocatello, ID; Teton Peaks, Idaho Falls, ID; Utah National Parks, Provo, UT; Verdugo Hills, Glendale, CA; and Winnebago, Waterloo, IA.

During the piloting phase, a study was conducted to evaluate the effectiveness of Varsity Scouting.

This dissertation is an evaluation of the pre-pilot Varsity Scout program used in Area 2 of the Western Region of the Boy Scouts of America. Varsity Scouting was developed by a committee of volunteer Scouters as an alternative program for 14- and 15-year-old boys and consisted of traditional Scouting methods with added emphasis on high adventure, service, and the application of Scoutings' [sic] programs.

After its development, the Varsity Scout program was introduced in a pre-pilot program that lasted from January 1978 until January 1980. Before the Varsity Scouting program was launched, boys 14- and 15-years-of age in the Boy Scouts of America were either members of Scout troops or Explorer posts and had no opportunity to participate in a program specifically designed for their own age group. In the absence of a program model and without substantial current research into the needs of 14- and 15-year-old boys, a committee of concerned volunteer Scouters developed a foundation for Varsity Scouting based on their observations of the Scouting preferences of boys.

The general research plan initially developed in 1977 for studying the Varsity Scouting program, during its two year pre-test, made provision for the program's evaluation after one year of implementation with another evaluation to be conducted at the end of the two year pre-pilot. In addition to the two evaluations mentioned, a third evaluation was conducted, mid-way through the pre-pilot in order to probe the assumptions upon which the program was developed: questions needed to be answered with regards to the needs, interests and preferences of 14- and 15-year-old boys in order to determine what exactly would attract and hold them in a program specifically designed for their age group.

The three studies required by the general research plan for the Varsity Scouting pre-pilot program were conducted and evaluated as part of this author's doctoral program and the results thereof are reported in this dissertation. The initial research data was gathered by collecting and evaluating responses from participants in Varsity Scouting programs, by means of surveys made on random samples of populations of 14- and 15-year-old boys located in Utah and Idaho, the two states comprising the pre-pilot area.

The data collected were used to answer the two questions posed by the Varsity Scouting program: (1) are 14- and 15-year-old boys attracted to the traditional Scouting methods, and (2) would the implementation of the Varsity Scouting program trigger a resurgence of interest in the traditional Scouting methods in all Scouting groups serving 14- and 15-year-old boys (i.e. Exploring, Leadership Corps and Varsity Scouting).

The three studies comprising Catherall's dissertation verified that Varsity Scouting was indeed a success. The data he gathered showed that after being exposed to Varsity Scouting, 14- and 15-year-old boys wanted more outdoor activities and that they preferred Varsity Scouting over Exploring. Varsity Scouting activities were reported to be more fun and plentiful than Exploring. The study documented small increases in membership and more favorable attitudes towards uniforms. It also showed that Varsity Scouting offered an increase in advancement and leadership positions. Institutional leaders reported a 95% compatibility with the programs and ideals of their institutions. Exploring rated 85%.

=== Official program ===
Varsity Scouting was officially adopted by the BSA in 1984. Both the Varsity Scout Handbook for the boys and the Leader Guidebook were revised once again as third editions. The Church of Jesus Christ of Latter-day Saints officially endorsed the program on September 23, 1983., with a bulletin appeared on pages 79–80 of the January 1984 issue of the Ensign magazine.

=== Program evolution and demise ===
Although an officially approved BSA program, Varsity Scouting continued to face opposition. The validity of the program continued to be questioned. Supporters of Varsity Scouting had to fight, on several occasions, to preserve the program. The program survived, but not without considerable change.

In 1989 a push was made to redefine Varsity Scouting as more of a patrol-based program within the Troop. Varsity Patrols for older Scouts pursuing athletic interests, and Venture Patrols for older Scouts pursuing outdoor high adventure were introduced, both having roots in LDS Scouting tradition. Varsity Patrol were to emphasize sports. Venture Patrols pursue outdoor high adventure activities. Varsity Patrols were eventually discontinued, but Venture Patrols remain a part of the official literature.

In 1990, National dropped the Varsity Scout handbook from its inventory. About this same time, the position patches unique to Varsity Scouting were changed, dropping Varsity Scouting's "VS" logo and colors in favor of the colors and conventions used for traditional Boy Scout position patches.

In 2000, National replaced the Varsity Game Plan book and Activity Pin booklets with the "Team Program Features" program supplements.

In 2001, a new Varsity Scout Leader Guidebook was created by a committee of 17 Varsity Scouters. Paul M. Anderson served as Committee Chair; Joe C. Glasscock was the Professional Adviser. With the introduction of the new handbook, the requirements for earning the Varsity Letter were significantly reduced and a higher award, the Denali Award, was introduced.

Wood Badge for the 21st Century was introduced in conjunction with a newly revised training curriculum. The new Wood Badge displaced Varsity Scouting's unique version of Wood Badge training and does not make mention of the program. The prerequisite training curriculum did not include a syllabus for Varsity Leader Specific Training for well over a year.

In 2014, the Varsity Scout Pledge was discontinued.

In May 2017, The Church of Christ of Latter-Day Saints announced that it would, at the conclusion of that year, end its participation in the Varsity Scouting program. Since a very large proportion of Varsity Scouts were LDS members, this proved to be the end for Varsity Scouting. Remaining Varsity programs were merged into other Scouting offerings.

== Organization and leadership ==
The Varsity Scout team was sponsored by a community organization such as a business, service organization, school, labor group or religious institution. The chartered organization was responsible for selecting leadership, providing a meeting place and promoting a good program. The chartered organization representative is the liaison between the team, the chartered organization, and the BSA.

The team committee was a group of adults, led by the team committee chair, who plan the team program and activities and manage record keeping, finance, leadership recruitment and registration. The team generally met weekly providing a pre-planned program. It was led by a youth who is elected as captain who was guided by the team Coach and assistant team Coaches. The Coach had to be at least 21 and was directly responsible for training and guiding boy leaders, working with other adults to bring Varsity Scouting to boys and for using the methods of Scouting to achieve the aims of Scouting. The team was divided into squads of eight to ten Varsity Scouts, led by an elected squad leader. Program managers are assigned as needed to take charge of team activities.

New leaders were encouraged to attend training for their position. This training provided the essential information they need to provide a safe and successful quality program. Fast Start Training was the introduction for adult leaders new to the Varsity Scout program. Fast Start was self paced and provided as a video or online video. Youth Protection Training is required for all adult leaders and must be recertified per local council policy. Basic Leader Training for Coaches consisted of Varsity Coach Leader Specific Training and Introduction to Outdoor Leadership Skills. Basic Leader Training for team committee members consists of Team Committee Challenge. Once Basic Leader Training was completed, the leader was awarded a Trained emblem for uniform wear.

Supplemental training modules were designed to provide orientation beyond Basic Leader Training. These shorter training sessions were often provided at the Roundtable, a monthly meeting of leaders from the district, at a University of Scouting program offered by the local council and at National Cub Scouting Conferences held at the Philmont Scout Ranch and the Florida National High Adventure Sea Base.

Wood Badge is the advanced training program for leadership skills for all adults in all BSA programs. Wood Badge consists of six days of training (usually presented as two three-day weekends) and an application phase of several months. When training is complete, leaders are recognized with the Wood Badge beads, neckerchief and woggle. Coaches provide initial youth leader training within at the team level. Youth leaders are encouraged to attend National Youth Leadership Training at the district or council level.

== Advancement and recognition ==
Venture patrol strip

Varsity Scouts wore the standard Boy Scout field uniform, but wore blaze shoulder loops and a Varsity uniform strip above the Boy Scouts of America strip. Adults wore the same Varsity Scout uniform and could wear the Scouter dress uniform as required.

=== Youth advancement ===
Varsity Scout Letter and Bar

Activity Pins

Denali Award

Advancement was a key part of the Varsity program. Varsity Scouts could earn any other award or recognition that is available to Boy Scouts, including merit badges, ranks advancements, and other awards. There were also several awards that are only available to Varsity Scouts, and sometimes their leaders. The Varsity Letter could be earned by participating in or accomplishing at least one high adventure or sports program, according to guidelines determined by the Varsity Coach, meeting attendance requirements and showing Scout Spirit.

The Varsity Letter was a cloth patch that could be worn either on the front bottom of a merit badge sash or on the right breast of the Varsity Scout or Boy Scout jacket. This award could be earned every three months by an actively participating Varsity Scout. Subsequent awards are represented by gold bars pinned on the letter. Activity pins could also be pinned on the Varsity Letter.

Varsity Scouts could also earn activity pins in several areas of high adventure and sports. Program resources and official pins were available for backpacking, basketball, bowling, canoe camping, caving, cross-country skiing, cycling, discovering America, fishing, freestyle biking, frontiersman, mechanics, Operation On-Target, orienteering, rock climbing and rappelling, roller hockey, shooting sports, snow camping, soccer, survival, swimming, tennis, triathlon, volleyball, water skiing, and whitewater canoeing. The requirements for earning an activity pin were determined locally by the team captain and are usually awarded at the conclusion of each ultimate adventure or sports season.

The Denali Award was the highest award in Varsity Scouting. The award is named after Denali in Alaska. Requirements included advancing at least one rank in the Boy Scout program (or earning a palm for those who are already Eagle Scouts), serving in a leadership position for six months, taking primary and supportive leadership roles for activities in all five areas of emphasis, living the Scout Oath, and completing a progress review.

=== Adult recognition ===
Adult Varsity leaders could earn the Varsity Letter and activity pins. They met the same requirements as the youth and also had to complete Fast Start and Basic Leader Training (New Leader Essentials and Varsity Coach Leader Specific Training), attend six Varsity Roundtables, and have completed a minimum of six months tenure.

Varsity Scout leaders who completed tenure, training and performance requirements could earn the Varsity Scout Leader Training Award. Varsity Coaches could earn the Varsity Coach's Key and the Varsity Scout Coach Award of Merit.
