= Dikwillem =

Mountain in Namibia

Dicker Wilhelm
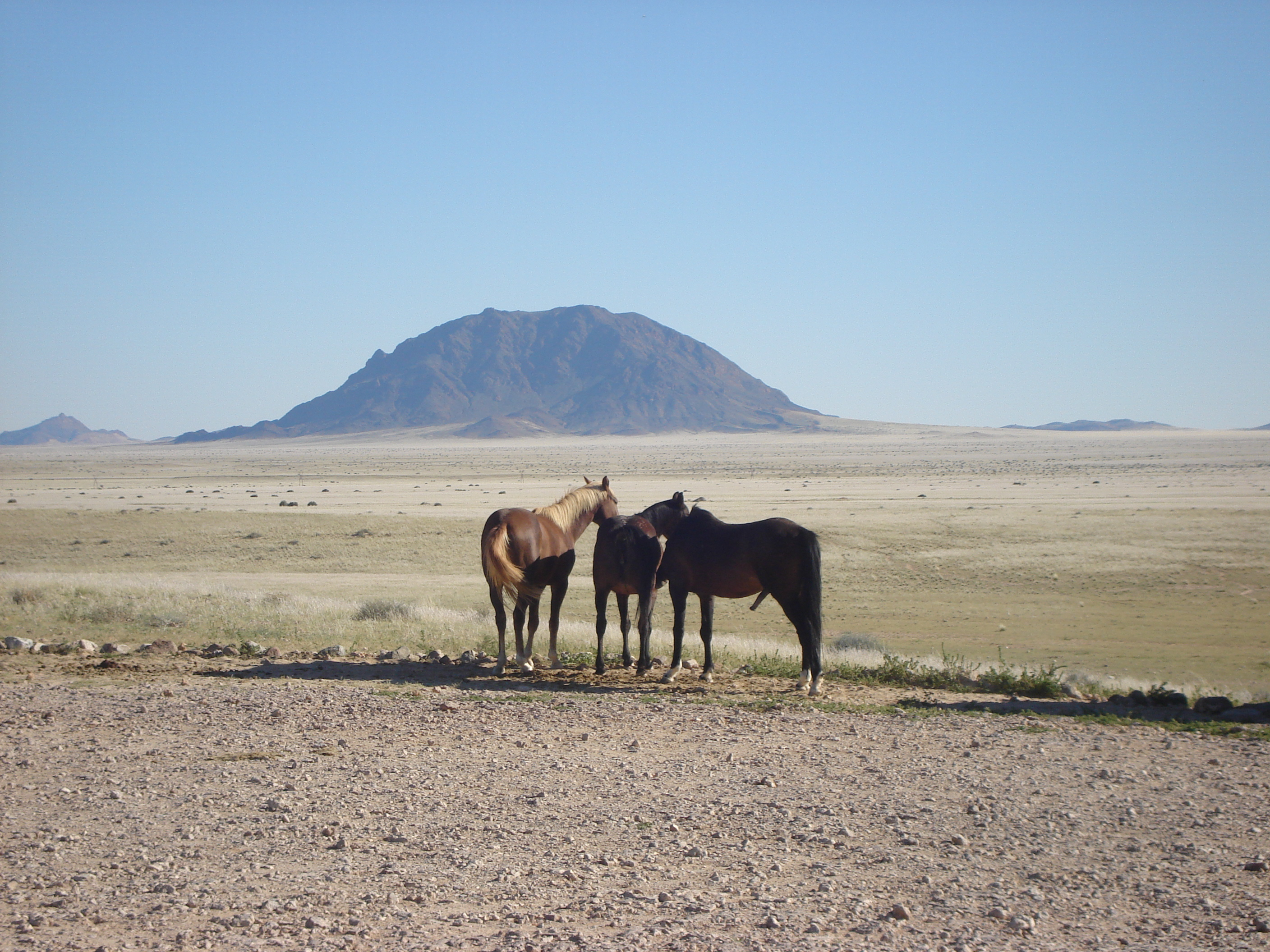
- Dicker Wilhelm with Wild Horses in front

Highest point
- Elevation: 1,496 m (4,908 ft)
- Coordinates: 26°28′04″S 016°01′08″E

Naming
- Native name: Dikwillem (Afrikaans)

Geography
- Location within Namibia
- Location: Namibia

Dikwillem (Afrikaans) or Dicker Wilhelm (German), also known as Garub-Berg or Garubberg, is a mountain in Namibia. With an elevation of 1496 meters and lying within the Namib desert, the mountain is visible from a great distance from all directions. It is about 15 kilometers north of the B4 road and about 80 kilometers east of Lüderitz.

The harsh environment and barren plains around Garub became the habitat of the desert horses of the Namib – descendants from German cavalry horses who adapted to the conditions and dry climate of the desert.

During the time of German colonial empire a heliographic station was operated by the German Schutztruppe on top of Dikwillem.

== Gallery ==
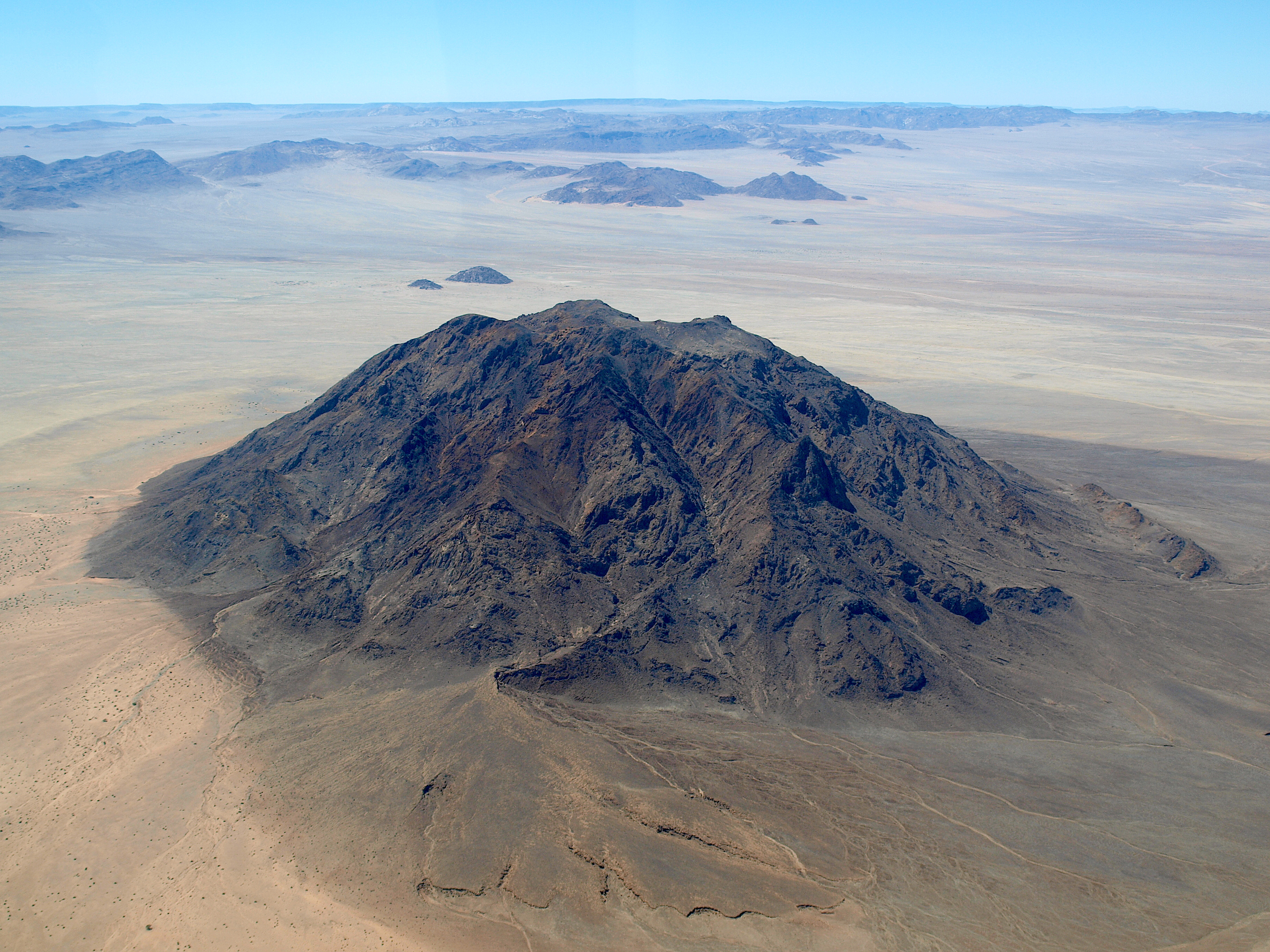
Aerial view of Dicker Wilhelm (2010)

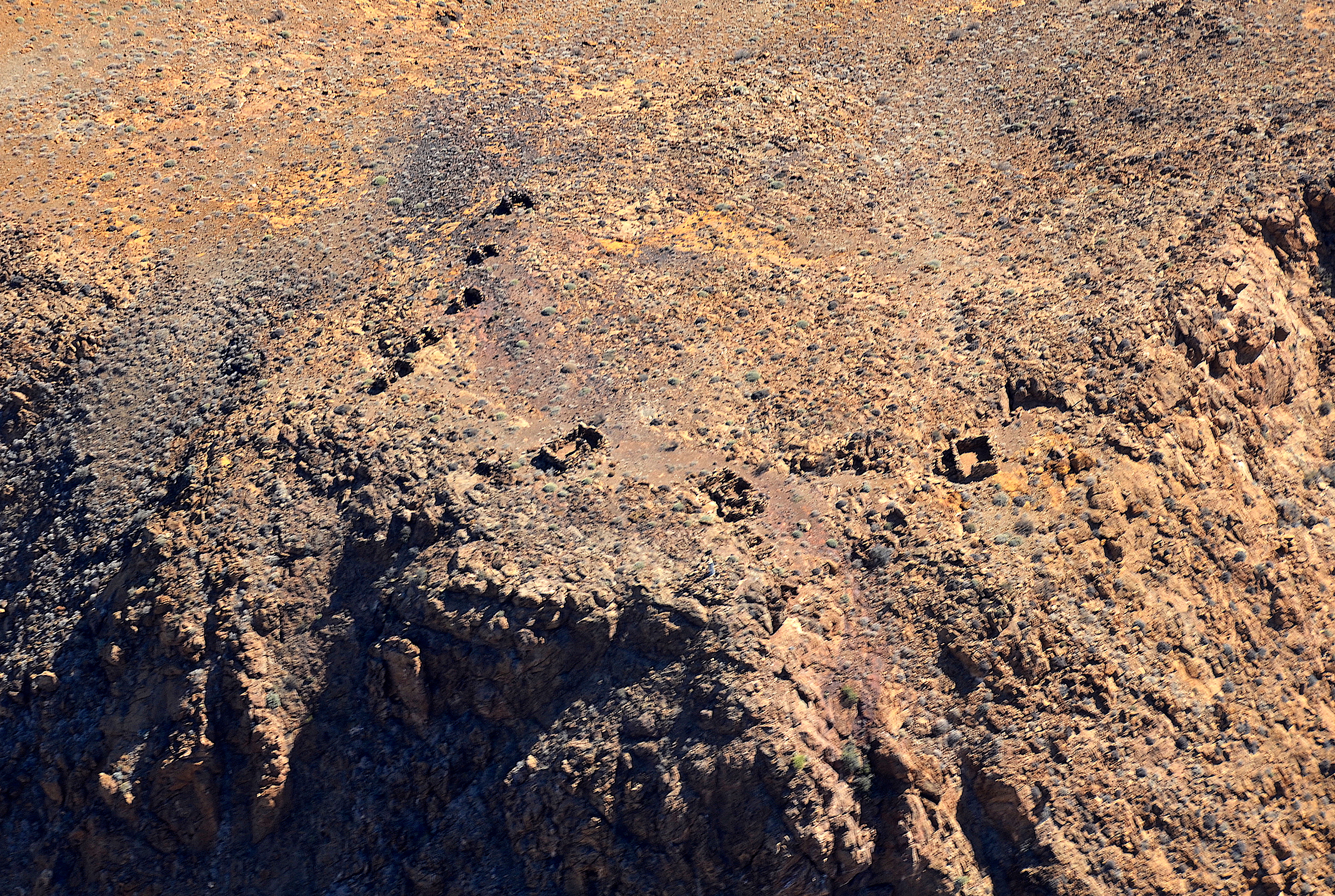
Ruins of German Schutztruppe on top of Dikwillem (Bird's eye view 2017)
