= Heliotrope (instrument) =

Measuring instrument

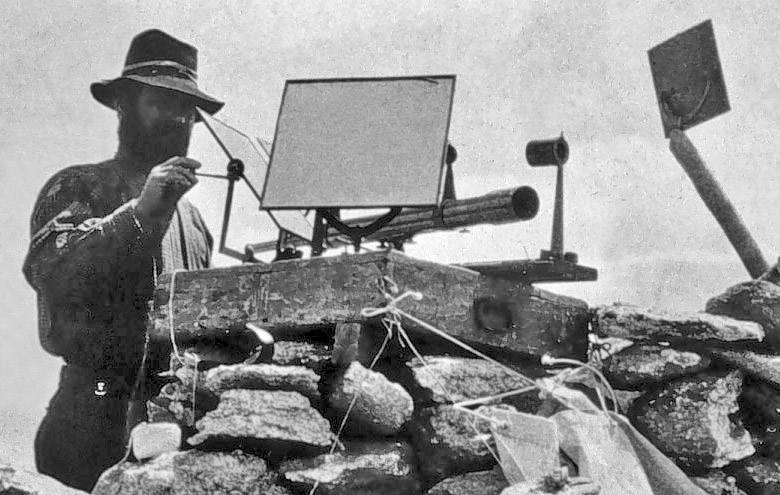
Heliotrope (c. 1878): B.A. Colonna collection (NOAA). This may be the very one Colonna surveyed from 192 miles away.

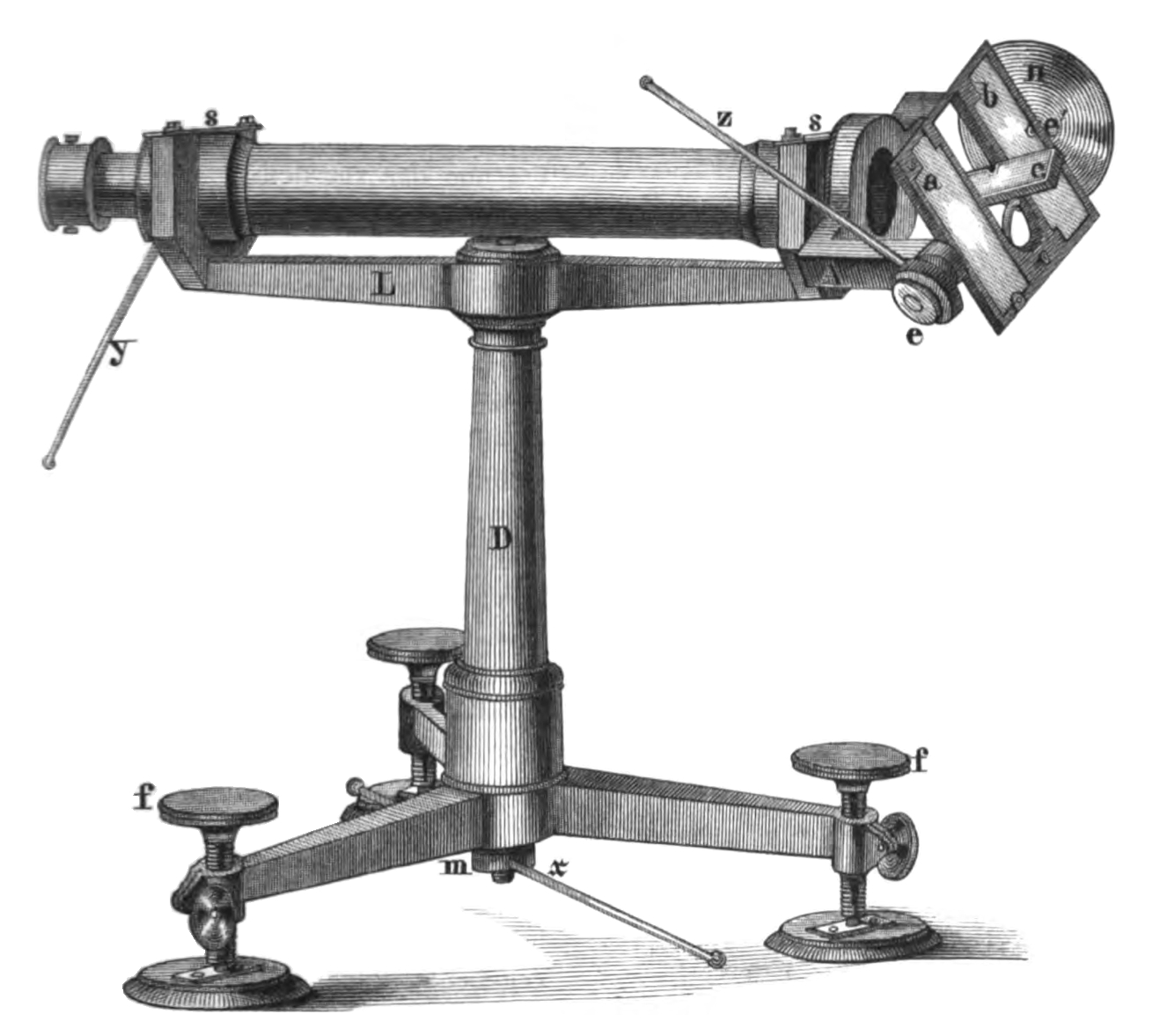
Gauss's Heliotrope (c. 1822)

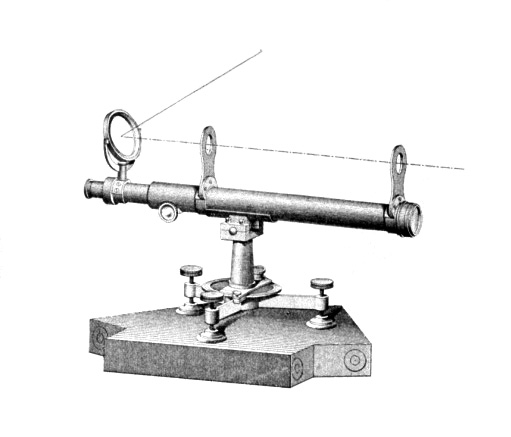
Wurdemann's Heliotrope (1866)

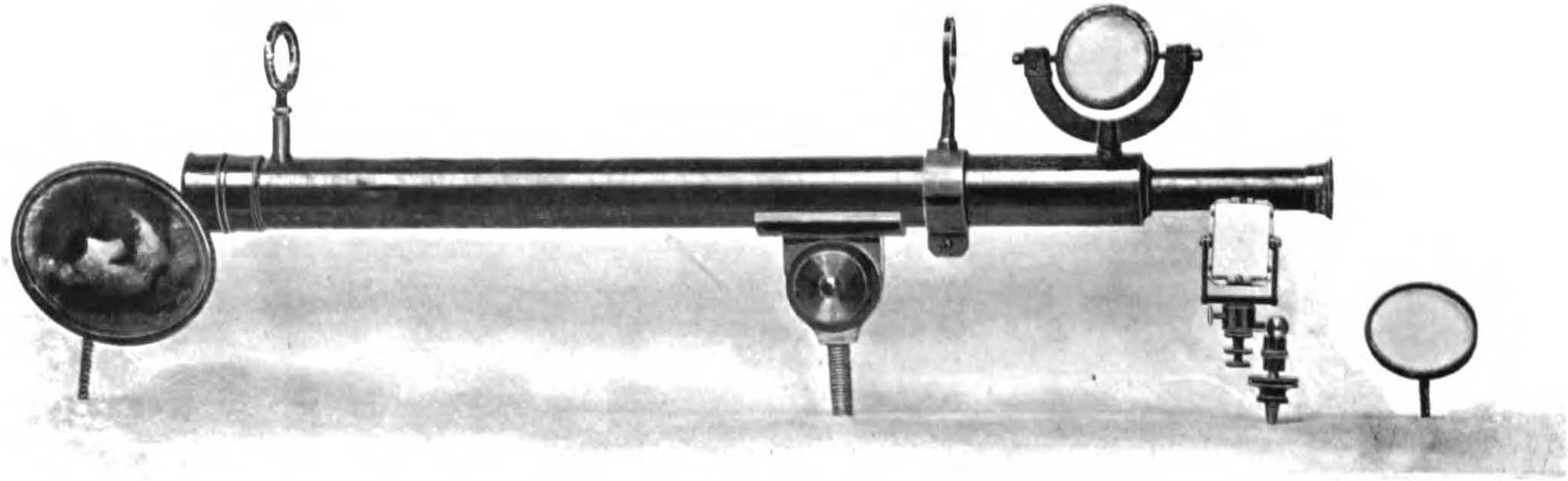
Coast Survey, Steinheil, and simple heliotropes c. 1898

The heliotrope is an instrument that uses a mirror to reflect sunlight over great distances to mark the positions of participants in a land survey. The heliotrope was invented in 1821 by the German mathematician Carl Friedrich Gauss. The word "heliotrope" is taken from the Greek: helios (Greek: Ἥλιος), meaning "sun", and tropos (Greek: τρόπος), meaning "turn".

== History ==
Heliotropes were used in surveys from Gauss's survey in Germany in 1821 through the late 1980s, when GPS measurements replaced the use of the heliotrope in long distance surveys. Colonel Sir George Everest introduced the use of heliotropes into the Great Trigonometric Survey in India around 1831, and the United States Coast and Geodetic Survey used heliotropes to survey the United States. The Indian specification for heliotropes was updated in 1981, and the American military specification for heliotropes (MIL-H-20194E) was retired on 8 December 1995.

Surveyors used the heliotrope as a specialized form of survey target; it was employed during large triangulation surveys where, because of the great distance between stations (usually twenty miles or more), a regular target would be indistinct or invisible. Heliotropes were often used as survey targets at ranges of over 100 miles. In California, in 1878, a heliotrope on Mount Saint Helena was surveyed by B. A. Colonna of the United States Coast and Geodetic Survey from Mount Shasta, a distance of 192 miles (309 km).

The heliotrope was limited to use on sunny days and was further limited (in regions of high temperatures) to mornings and afternoons when atmospheric aberration least affected the instrument-man's line of sight. The heliotrope operator was called a "heliotroper" or "flasher" and would sometimes employ a second mirror for communicating with the instrument station through heliography, a signalling system using impulsed reflecting surfaces. The inventor of the heliograph, a similar instrument specialized for signaling, was inspired by observing the use of heliotropes in the survey of India.

== See also ==
- Heliograph, a similar instrument, used in communication
