= Heliograph =

Tripod-mounted mirror device used as solar telegraph

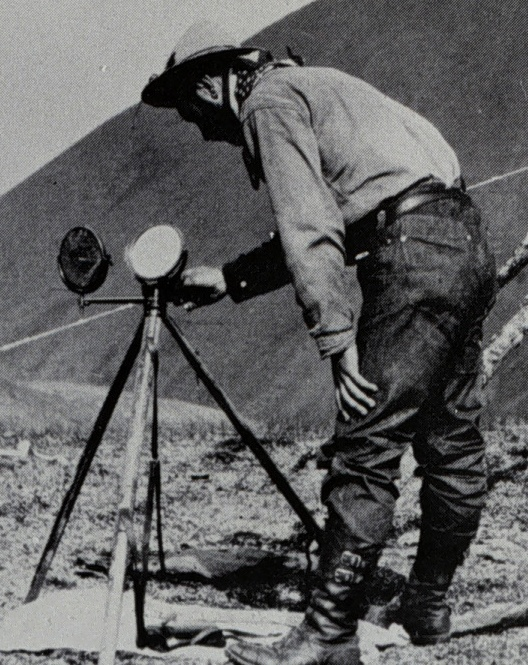
Fig. 1: Signaling with a Mance heliograph; Alaska–Canada border, 1910.

A heliograph (from Ancient Greek ἥλιος (hḗlios) 'sun' and γράφειν (gráphein) 'to write') is a solar telegraph system that signals by flashes of sunlight (generally using Morse code from the 1840s) reflected by a mirror. The flashes are produced by momentarily pivoting the mirror, or by interrupting the beam with a shutter.

The heliograph was a simple but effective instrument for instantaneous optical communication over long distances during the late 19th and early 20th centuries. Its main uses were military, surveying and forest protection work. Heliographs were standard issue in the British and Royal Australian armies until the 1960s, and were used by the Pakistani army as late as 1975. While these solar telegraphs are now obsolete, the daylight signalling mirrors required worldwide in oceangoing lifeboats are often called "heliographs" in Commonwealth nations.

== Description ==
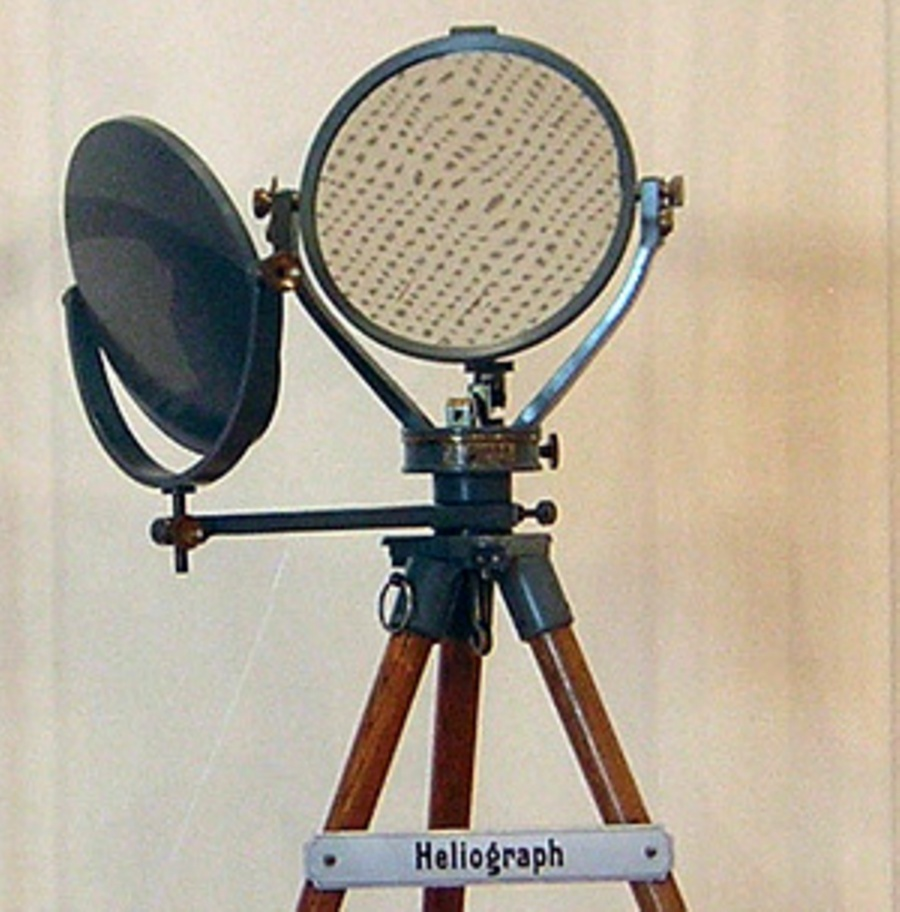
Fig. 2: A German heliograph made by R. Fuess in Berlin, on display at the Museum of Communication in Frankfurt

There were many heliograph types. Most heliographs were variants of the British Army Mance Mark V version (Fig.1). It used a flat round mirror with a small unsilvered spot in the centre. The sender aligned the heliograph to the target by looking at the reflected target in the mirror and moving their head until the target was hidden by the unsilvered spot. Keeping their head still, they then adjusted the aiming rod so its cross wires bisected the target.

They then turned up the sighting vane, which covered the cross wires with a diagram of a cross, and aligned the mirror with the tangent and elevation screws, so the small shadow that was the reflection of the unsilvered spot hole was on the cross target. This indicated that the sunbeam was pointing at the target. The flashes were produced by a keying mechanism that tilted the mirror up a few degrees at the push of a lever at the back of the instrument.

If the Sun was in front of the sender, its rays were reflected directly from this mirror to the receiving station. If the Sun was behind the sender, the sighting rod was replaced by a second mirror, to capture the sunlight from the main mirror and reflect it to the receiving station. The U.S. Army's Signal Corps heliograph used a flat square mirror that did not tilt. This type produced flashes by a shutter mounted on a second tripod (Fig 4).

The heliograph had certain advantages. It allowed long-distance communication without a fixed infrastructure, though it could also be linked to make a fixed network extending for hundreds of miles, as in the fort-to-fort network used for the Geronimo military campaign. It was very portable, did not require any power source, and was relatively secure since it was invisible to those not near the axis of operation, and the beam was very narrow, spreading only 50 ft (15 m) per 1 mi (1.6 km) of range. However, anyone in the beam with the correct knowledge could intercept signals without being detected.

In the Second Boer War (1899–1902) in South Africa, where both sides used heliographs, tubes were sometimes used to decrease the dispersion of the beam. In some other circumstances, though, a narrow beam made it difficult to stay aligned with a moving target, as when communicating from shore to a moving ship, so the British issued a dispersing lens to broaden the heliograph beam from its natural diameter of 0.5 degrees to 15 degrees.

The range of a heliograph depends on the opacity of the air and the effective collecting area of the mirrors. Heliograph mirrors ranged from 1.5 to 12 in (38 to 305 mm) or more. Stations at higher altitudes benefit from thinner, clearer air, and are required in any event for great ranges, to clear the curvature of the Earth. A good approximation for ranges of 20 to 50 mi (32 to 80 km) is that the flash of a circular mirror is visible to the naked eye at a distance of 10 mi (16 km) for each inch of mirror diameter, and farther apart seen with a telescope.

The world record distance was established by a detachment of U.S. Army signal sergeants by the inter-operation of stations in North America on Mount Ellen (Utah), and Mount Uncompahgre (Colorado), 183 mi (295 km) apart on 17 September 1894, with Army Signal Corps heliographs carrying mirrors only 8 inches (20 cm) on a side.

== History ==
A 12 in × 12 in (300 mm × 300 mm) heliographic signal mirror reflecting on the top of Mount Baden-Powell

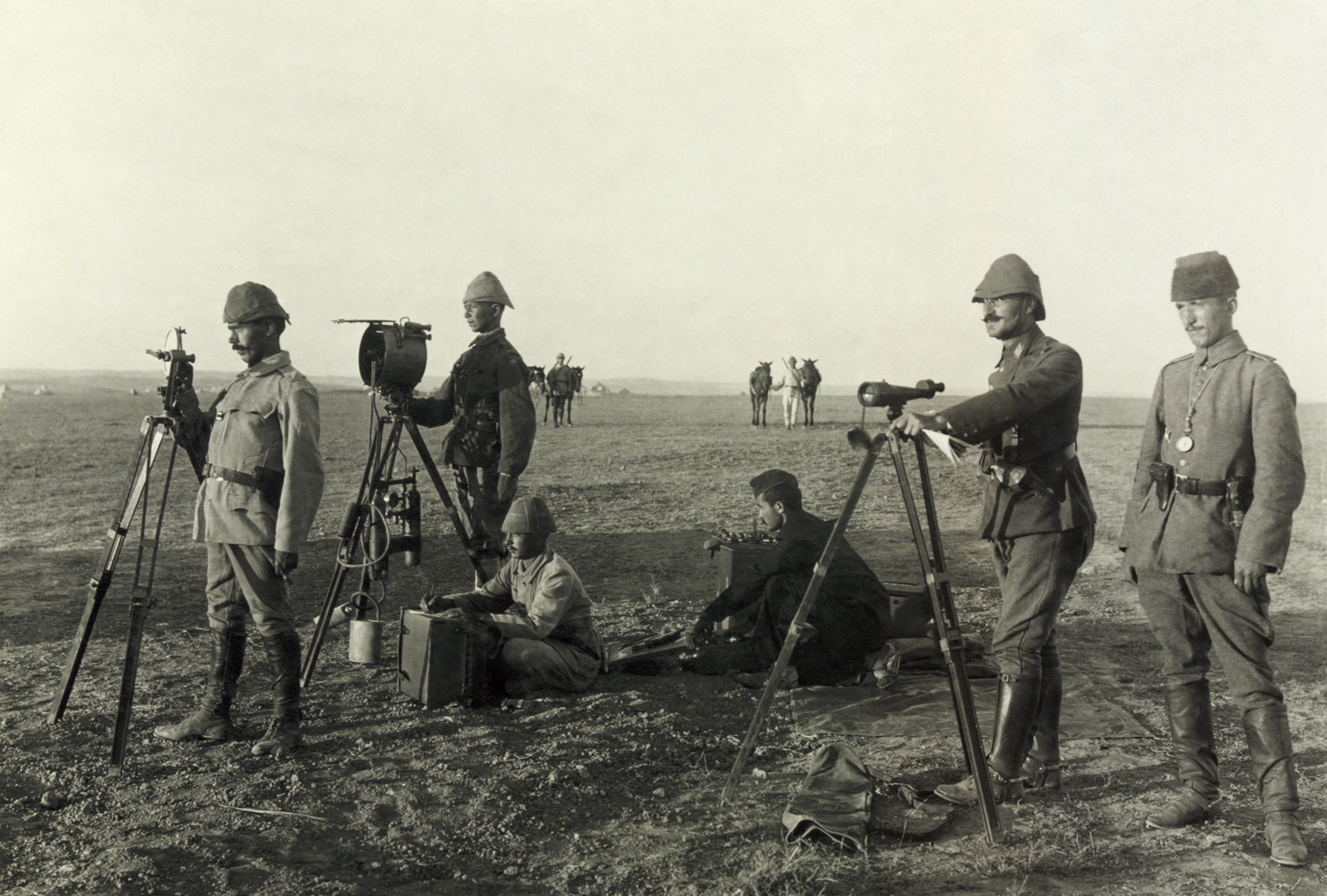
Fig. 3 A Turkish / Ottoman Empire heliograph military crew at Huj during the First World War, 1917

The German professor Carl Friedrich Gauss (1777–1855), of the University of Göttingen developed and used a predecessor of the heliograph (the heliotrope) in 1821. His device directed a controlled beam of sunlight to a distant station to be used as a marker for geodetic survey work, and was suggested as a means of telegraphic communications. This is the first reliably documented heliographic device, despite much speculation about possible ancient incidents of sun-flash signalling, and the documented existence of other forms of ancient optical telegraphy.

For example, one author in 1919 chose to "hazard the theory" that the Italian mainland signals from the capital of Rome that ancient Roman emperor Tiberius (42 B.C.-A.D.37, reigned A.D.14 to 37), watched for from his imperial retreat on the island of Capri. were mirror flashes, but admitted "there are no references in ancient writings to the use of signaling by mirrors", and that the documented means of ancient long-range visual telecommunications was by beacon fires and beacon smoke, not mirrors.

Similarly, the story that a shield was used as a heliograph at the ancient famous Battle of Marathon between the Greeks and Persians in 490 B.C. is a modern myth, originating in the 1800s. The ancient historian Herodotus never mentioned any flash. What Herodotus did write was that someone was accused of having arranged to "hold up a shield as a signal". Suspicion grew in the later 1900s, that the flash theory was implausible. The conclusion after testing the theory was "Nobody flashed a shield at the Battle of Marathon".

In a letter dated 3 June 1778, John Norris, High Sheriff of Buckinghamshire, England, notes: "Did this day heliograph intelligence from Dr [Benjamin] Franklin in Paris to Wycombe". However, there is little evidence that "heliograph" here is other than a misspelling of "holograph". The term "heliograph" for solar telegraphy did not enter the English language until the 1870s—even the word "telegraphy" was not coined until the 1790s.

Henry Christopher Mance (1840–1926), of the British Government's Persian Gulf Telegraph Department, developed the first widely accepted heliograph about 1869, while stationed at Karachi (now in modern Pakistan) in the then Bombay Presidency of British India. Mance was familiar with heliotropes by their use earlier for the mapping project of the Great Trigonometrical Survey of India (done 1802–1871). The Mance Heliograph was operated easily by one man, and since it weighed about 7 lb (3.2 kg), the operator could readily carry the device and its supporting tripod. The British Army tested the heliograph in India at a range of 35 mi (56 km) with favorable results. During the Jowaki Afridi expedition sent by the British-Indian government in 1877, the heliograph was first tested in war.

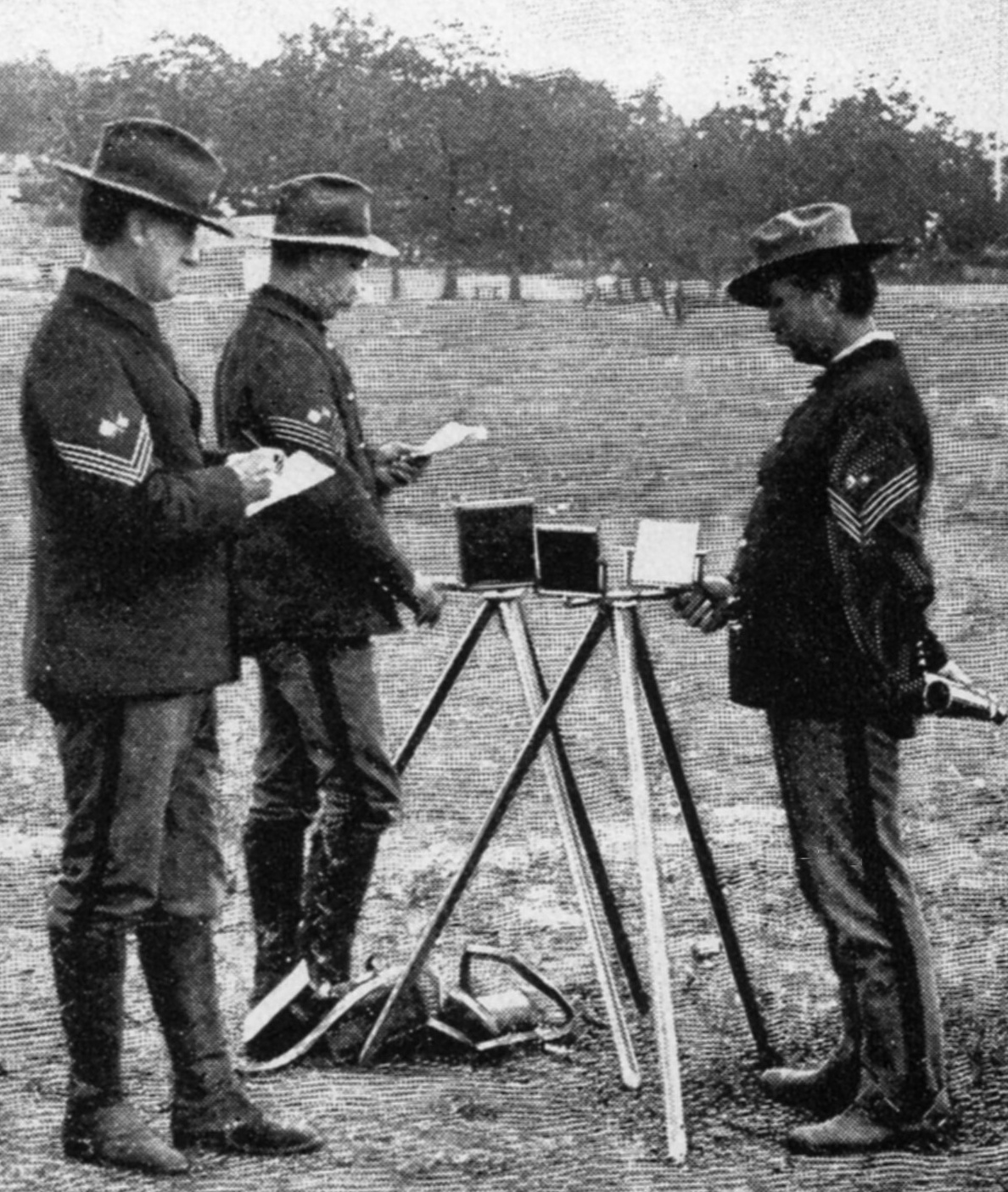
Fig. 4: A U.S. Army Signal Corps heliograph instrument, 1898

The simple and effective instrument that Mance invented was to be an important part of military communications for more than 60 years. The usefulness of heliographs was limited to daytimes with strong sunlight, but they were the most powerful type of visual signalling device known. In pre-radio times heliography was often the only means of communication that could span ranges of as much as 100 mi (160 km) with a lightweight portable instrument.

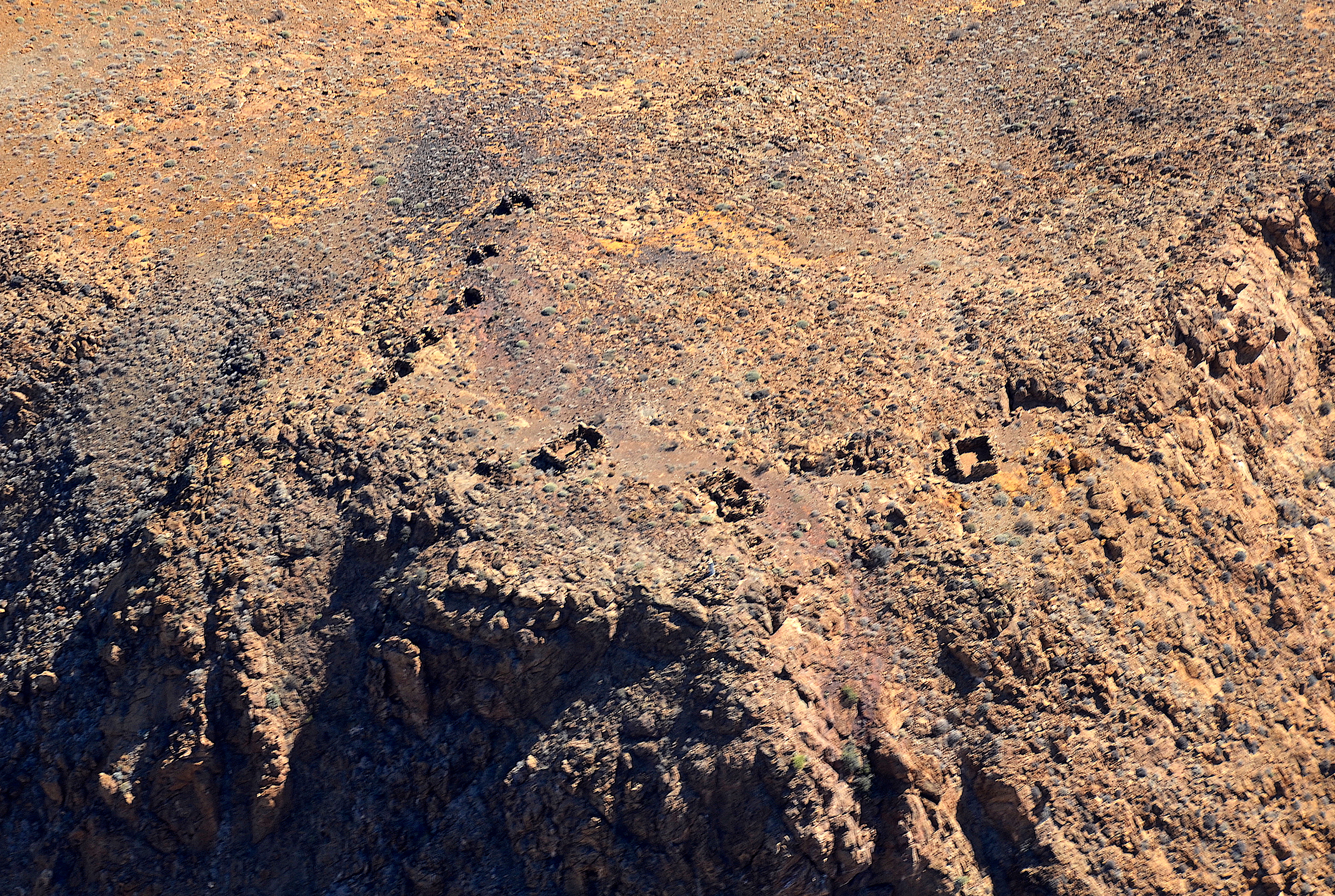
The ruins of a German Schutztruppe on top of the mountain Dikwillem, where the Germans used to have a Heliographic Station, 2017

In the United States military, by mid-1878, a younger Colonel Nelson A. Miles had established a line of heliographs connecting far-flung military outposts of Fort Keogh and Fort Custer, in the northern Montana Territory, a distance of 140 mi (230 km). In 1886, United States Army now General Nelson A. Miles (1839–1925), set up a network of 27 heliograph stations in the Arizona and New Mexico territories of the old Southwest during the extended campaign and hunt for the native Apache renegade chief / guerrilla warfare leader Geronimo (1829–1909).

In 1890, now little-known Major W.J. Volkmar of the U.S. Army demonstrated in the Arizona and New Mexico territories, the possibility of performing communication by heliograph over a heliograph network aggregating 2,000 mi (3,200 km) in length. The network of communication begun by General Miles in 1886, and continued by unsung and now relatively unknown Lieutenant W. A. Glassford, was perfected in 1889 at ranges of 85, 88, 95 and 125 mi (137, 142, 153 and 201 km) over a rugged and broken country, which was the stronghold of the Apache, Commanche and other hostile native Indian tribes.

By 1887, heliographs in use included the British Mance and Begbie heliographs, and the American Grugan, Garner and Pursell heliographs. The Grugan and Pursell heliographs used shutters, and the others used movable mirrors operated by a finger key. The Mance, Grugan and Pursell heliographs used two tripods, and the others one. The signals could either be momentary flashes, or momentary obscurations.

In 1888, the U.S. Army Signal Corps reviewed all of these devices, as well as the Finley Helio-Telegraph, and finding none completely suitable, developed its own instrument of the U.S. Army Signal Corps heliograph, a two-tripod, shutter-based machine of 13 7/8 lb (6.3 kg) total weight, and ordered 100, for a total cost of $4,205. By 1893, the number of heliographs manufactured for the American Army Signal Corps was 133.

The heyday of the heliograph was probably the Second Boer War of the 1890s and early 1900s in South Africa, where it was much used by both the British and the native immigrant Boers. The terrain and climate, as well as the nature of the campaign, made heliography a logical choice. For night communications, the British used some large signal lamps, brought inland on railroad cars, and equipped with leaf-type shutters for keying a beam of light into dots and dashes. During the early stages of the war, the British Army garrisons were besieged in Kimberley, along with the sieges of Ladysmith, and at Mafeking. With land wire telegraph lines cut, the only contact with the outside world was via light-beam communication, helio by day, and signal lamps at night.

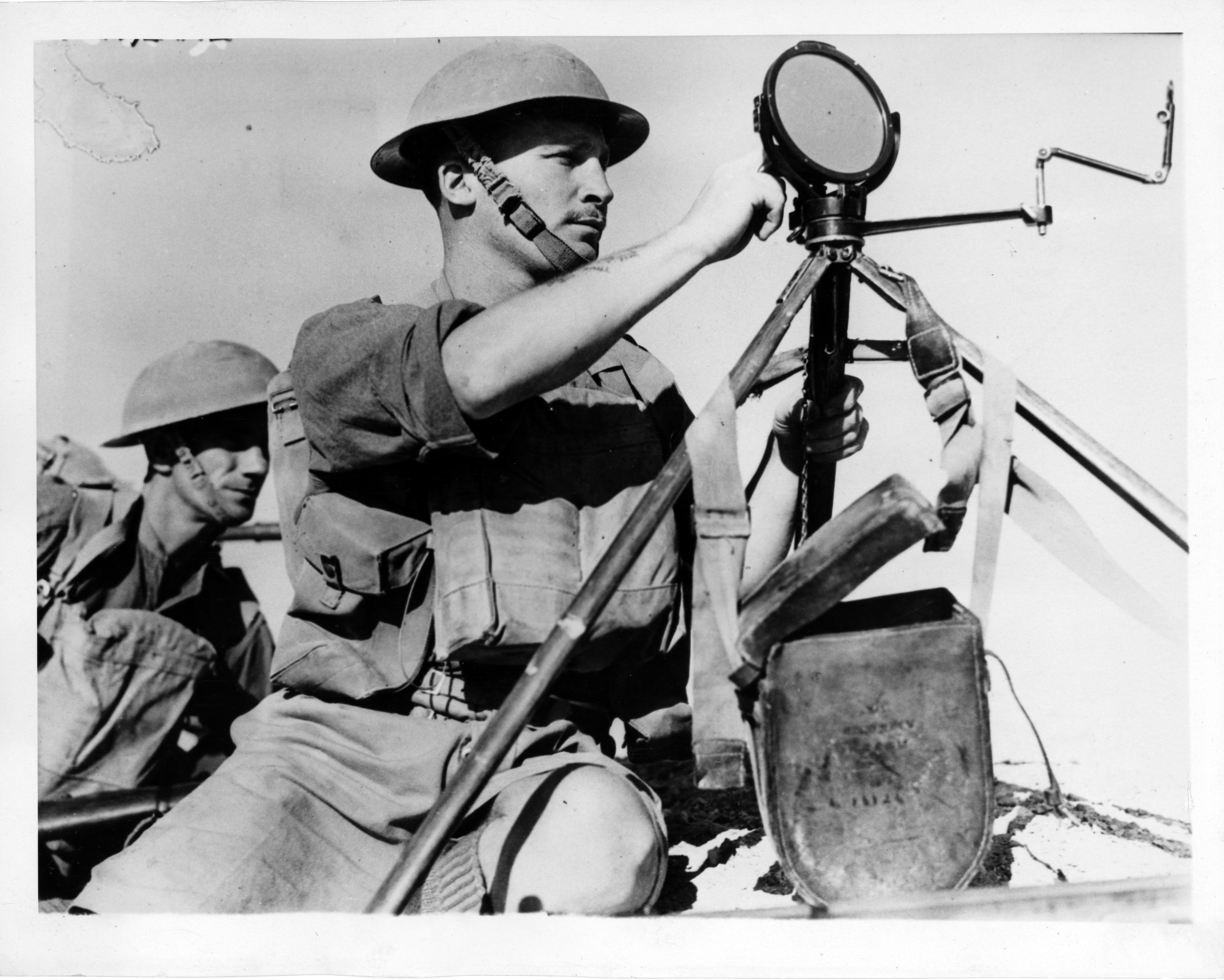
British Army troops training with a heliograph during the Second World War in North Africa, Egypt, June 1940

In 1909, the use of heliography for forestry protection was introduced by the United States Forestry Service in the western States. By 1920, such use was widespread in the US and beginning in the neighboring Dominion of Canada to the north, and the heliograph was regarded as "next to the telephone, the most useful communication device that is at present available for forest-protection services". D.P. Godwin of the U.S. Forestry Service invented a very portable (4.5 lb [2.0 kg]) heliograph of the single-tripod, shutter plus mirror type for forestry use.

Immediately prior to the outbreak of World War I (1914–1918), the mounted cavalry regiments of the Russian Imperial Army in the Russian Empire were still being trained in heliograph communications to augment the efficiency of their scouting and reporting roles. Following the two Russian Revolutions of 1917, the revolutionary Bolshevik / Communist units of their Red Army during the subsequent Russian Civil War of 1918–1922, made use of a series of heliograph stations to disseminate intelligence efficiently. This continued even a decade later about counter-revolutionary basmachi rebel movements in Central Asia's Turkestan region in 1926.

During World War II (1939–1945), Union of South Africa and Royal Australian military forces used the heliograph while fighting enemy Nazi German and Fascist Italian forces along the southern coast of the Mediterranean Sea in Libya and western Egypt with fellow defending British military in the desert North African campaign in 1940, 1941 and 1942.

The heliograph remained standard equipment for military signallers in the Royal Australian and British armies until the 1940s, where it was considered a "low probability of intercept" type of communication. The Canadian Army was the last major military force to have the heliograph as an issue item. By the time the mirror instruments were retired, they were seldom used for signalling. However, as recently as the 1980s, heliographs were used by insurgent Afghan mujahedeen forces during the Soviet invasion of Afghanistan in 1978–1979. Signal mirrors are still included in survival kits for emergency signaling to search and rescue aircraft.

== Automated heliographs ==
Most heliographs of the 19th and 20th centuries were completely manual. The steps of aligning the heliograph on the target, co-aligning the reflected sunbeam with the heliograph, maintaining the sunbeam alignment as the sun moved, transcribing the message into flashes, modulating the sunbeam into those flashes, detecting the flashes at the receiving end, and transcribing the flashes into the message were all done manually.

Many French heliographs used clockwork heliostats to automatically steer out the sun's motion. By 1884, all active units of the "Mangin apparatus", a dual-mode French Army military field optical telegraph that could use either lantern or sunlight, were equipped with clockwork heliostats. The Mangin apparatus with heliostat was still in service in 1917.

Proposals to automate both the modulation of the sunbeam by clockwork, and the detection, by electrical selenium photodetectors, or photographic means, date back to at least 1882. In 1961, the United States Air Force was working on a space heliograph to signal between satellites.

In May 2012, "Solar Beacon" robotic mirrors designed at the University of California at Berkeley were mounted on the twin towers of the Golden Gate Bridge at the entrance to San Francisco Bay, and a web site set up where the public could schedule times for the mirrors to signal with sun-flashes, entering the time and their latitude, longitude and altitude. The solar beacons were later moved to Sather Tower at the U.C. – Berkeley campus. By June 2012, the public could specify a "custom show" of up to 32 "on" or "off" periods of 4 seconds each, permitting the transmission of a few characters of Morse Code. The designer described the Solar Beacon as a "heliostat", not a "heliograph".

The first digitally controlled heliograph was designed and built in 2015. It was a semi-finalist in the Broadcom MASTERS competition.

== See also ==
- Heliography, an early photographic process invented by Joseph Nicéphore Niépce around 1822
- Heliotrope (instrument)
- Operation On-Target, a Scouting program
- Signal lamp
- Signalling mirror Handheld mirror used as distress signal
