= Signalling mirror =

Small device with aiming aid for signaling

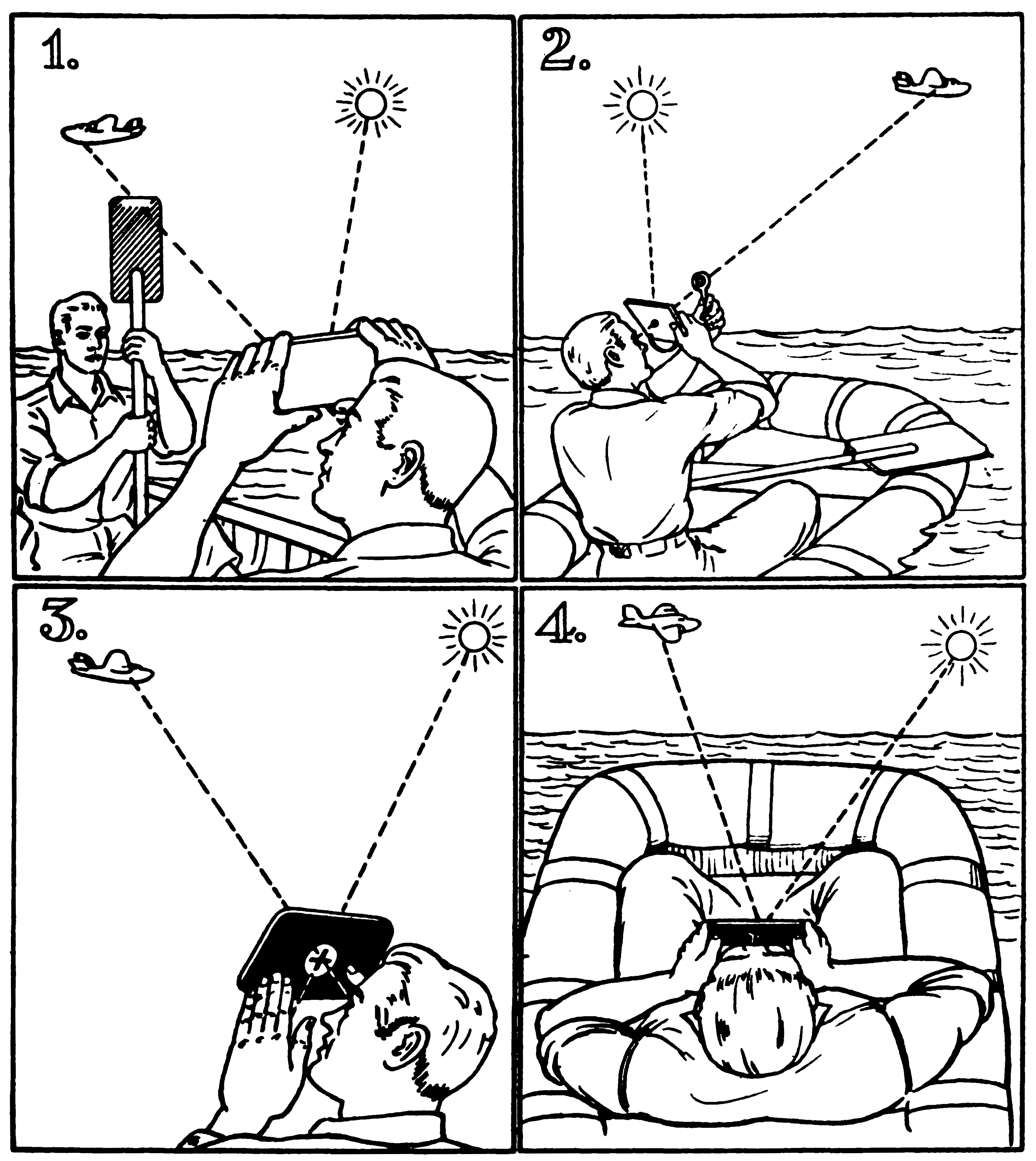
Fig. 1: Four methods of directing the flashes from daylight signalling mirrors, 1944

Signalling mirrors are handheld devices designed to signal distress by reflected sunlight. Unlike ordinary mirrors, signalling mirrors have integrated aiming aids that let the user accurately direct the reflected beam of sunlight.

Signalling mirrors with effective aiming means are required equipment on the lifeboats and liferafts of oceangoing ships, standard equipment in military survival kits, and carried by hikers and boaters.

Signalling mirrors have a sighting hole and an aiming aid. The aid is a foresight paddle, rear mirrored face, or retroreflective material around the sighting hole. British and American tests found retroreflective aids far superior to the others when signalling from rocking boats.

While ordinary mirrors have been used to signal for centuries, signalling mirrors were developed in World War 2.

== Description ==
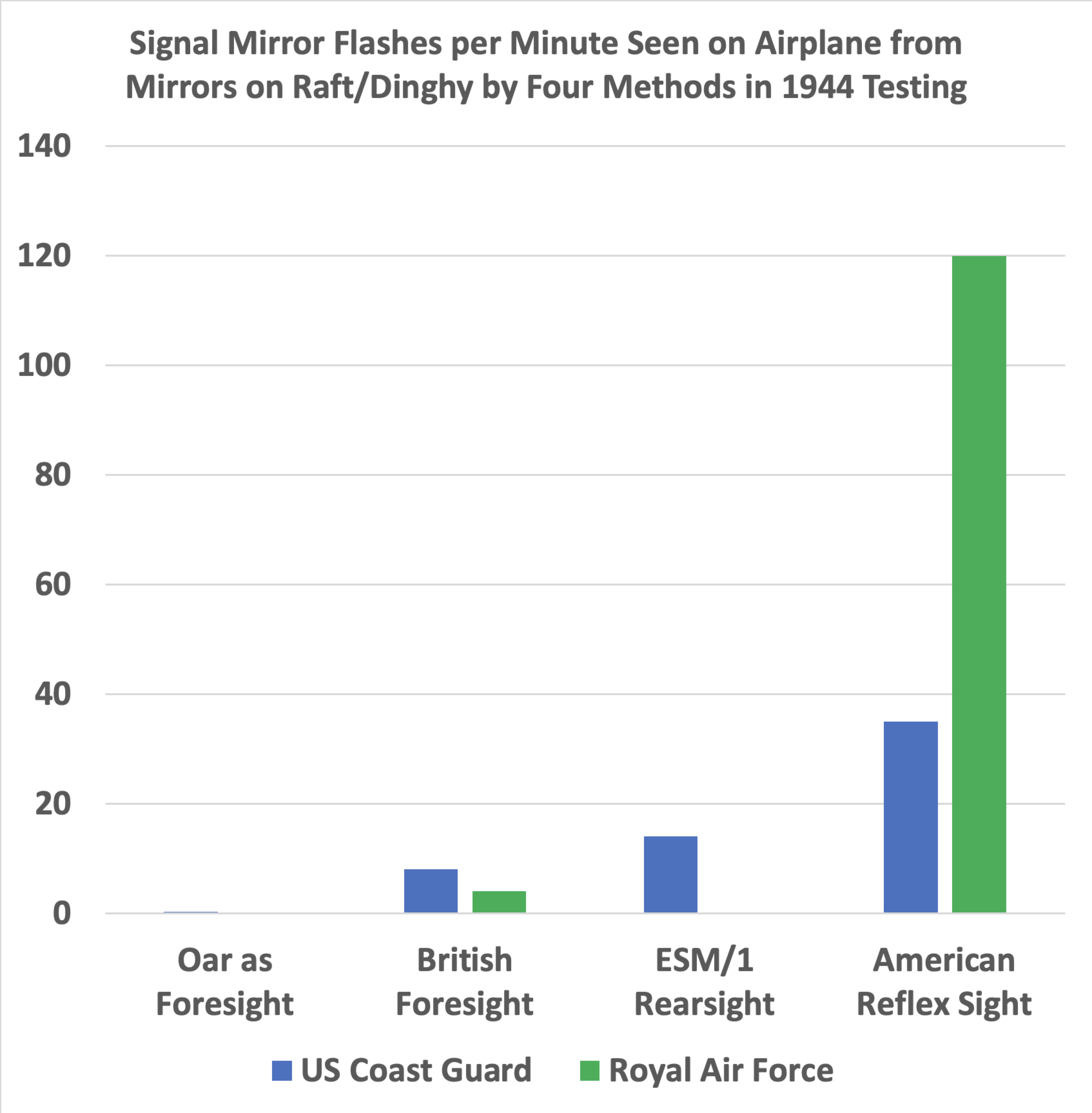
Fig. 2: Summary of US and British test results for four methods for directing the flashes from daylight signalling mirrors, 1944

Fig. 3 : Foresight and Rearsight aiming methods

Signalling mirrors are called "daylight signalling mirrors" by international maritime treaties and the International Organization on Standardization. The US military calls them "emergency signaling mirrors" or "mirror, emergency signaling". Less formal terms include "signal mirror" and "survival mirror". In Commonwealth countries the term "heliograph" is often used, especially for signalling mirrors aimed using foresights.

The three most common types of signalling mirror aiming aids are depicted in panels 2-4 of Figure 1:

- Foresight — aids use the light reflected on something in front of the mirror
- Rearsight — aids use the light reflected on something behind the mirror
- Reflex sights — create a virtual targeting image visible only through the sight

"Rearsight" mirrors use double-sided mirrors and "reflex sights" use retroreflective material. Independent testing by the US Coast Guard and the Royal Air Force in 1944 both concluded that the "reflex sight" method was by far the most accurate (Figure 2), and all current US military issue signalling mirrors use reflex sights with either retroreflective mesh or perforated retroreflective material.

Figure 3 illustrates what the user sees and the sunlight paths when using the "foresight" and "rearsight" aiming methods.

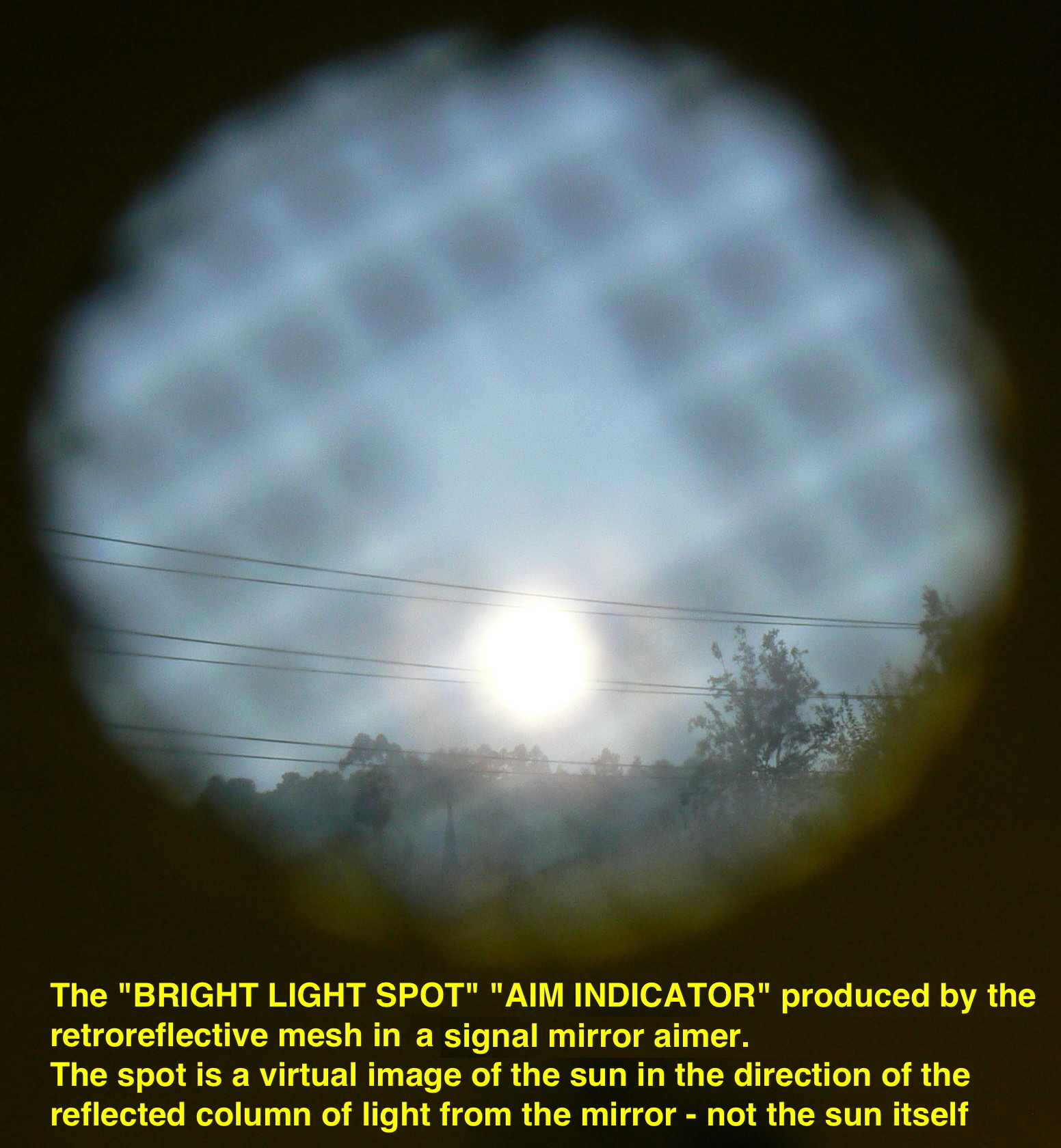
Fig 4: Reflex sight user's view through retroreflective mesh in Mark 3 signal mirror

Figure 4 illustrates the reflex sight "bright light spot" "aim indicator" the user sees through the retroreflective mesh reflex sight used in US military Mark 3 signal mirrors. This "bright light spot" is only visible when looking through the sight in the direction of the main reflected sunbeam.

While the flash from an ordinary mirror can be directed using the user's fingers or thumb as a foresight, this method is less accurate due to parallax errors and the fact that the angular width of the beam is far smaller at range than at arm's length.

Ordinary mirrors do not meet the SOLAS nor the US Coast Guard requirements for lifeboat equipment.

== History ==
Any reflective object can be used to reflect sunlight to gain attention, and this practice is of long standing. In an 1856 account, James Beckwourth describes signalling to Crow Indians with a looking glass c. 1830, and says the practice was common amongst them.

Francis Galton recommended the use of a handheld mirror for signaling in his book "Art of Travel", and was credited in 1857 with presciently suggesting "its great value to shipwrecked sailors in open boats or rafts on the sea, where their signals are often overlooked".

Reliably hitting a target with that narrow a beam with a handheld mirror at range beyond shouting distance is not a trivial task. The angular diameter of the reflected sunbeam from a flat mirror is that of the sun (less than 0.6°), so the difference between a "perfect hit" and a "clean miss" is less than 0.3°. The user is aided at close range by being able to see the beam on nearby objects, but this is rarely helpful when trying to signal a rescue plane in the sky.

In the 3rd Edition of his "Art of Travel" in 1860, Galton warned of the need for accuracy and the dangers of parallax when signalling with a handheld mirror. He suggests the use of various ground-mounted sighting objects, and described the rather bulky and complex self-contained handheld device he had developed.

There seems to have been little interest in integrated aiming aids for handheld mirrors prior to World War II.

Accurate long-distance sun-flashing prior to World War II was practiced from fixed locations to fixed targets. The mirrors on the heliotropes used by surveyors as beacon targets and the heliographs used by militaries for Morse communication were mounted in gimbals and secured to tripods, posts or tables.

This changed with World War II. Between U-boat sinkings and downed aircraft, many men were dying because rescue ships and planes could not spot them in the water. In several incidents, survivors were rescued thanks to reflecting sun from improvised devices. What was needed was a better way to accurately reflect sunlight from the moving sea to a moving rescue plane - a more challenging task than signalling on land.

Independent efforts began in Australia, England and the United States to develop mirrors with aiming aids to improve the survivor's chances.

The signalling mirror development effort in the United States was particularly intense. As described below, from the start of World War II to 1950, the mirror equipment in US Navy pilot life rafts was updated six times, and the US manufactured over 1 million of a single type of signalling mirror. This activity culminated with the development of the US military Mark 3 emergency signalling mirror with retroreflective mesh reflex aimer in 1949, a model issued to all branches of the US military today.

=== Australia – foresight and rearsight – 1942 ===
In Australia, Thomas Dunn Robertson began working on his "Improved mirror signalling device" after reading about men dying in lifeboats, and of one group rescued by reflections from a tobacco tin. Robertson filed a patent application on 11 November 1942 for his device, which could be aimed by both "foresight" and "rearsight" methods. The Australian Merchant Marine and R.A.A.F. ordered 13,000 in World War II.

=== England: "foresight" mirror/heliographs – 1943 ===
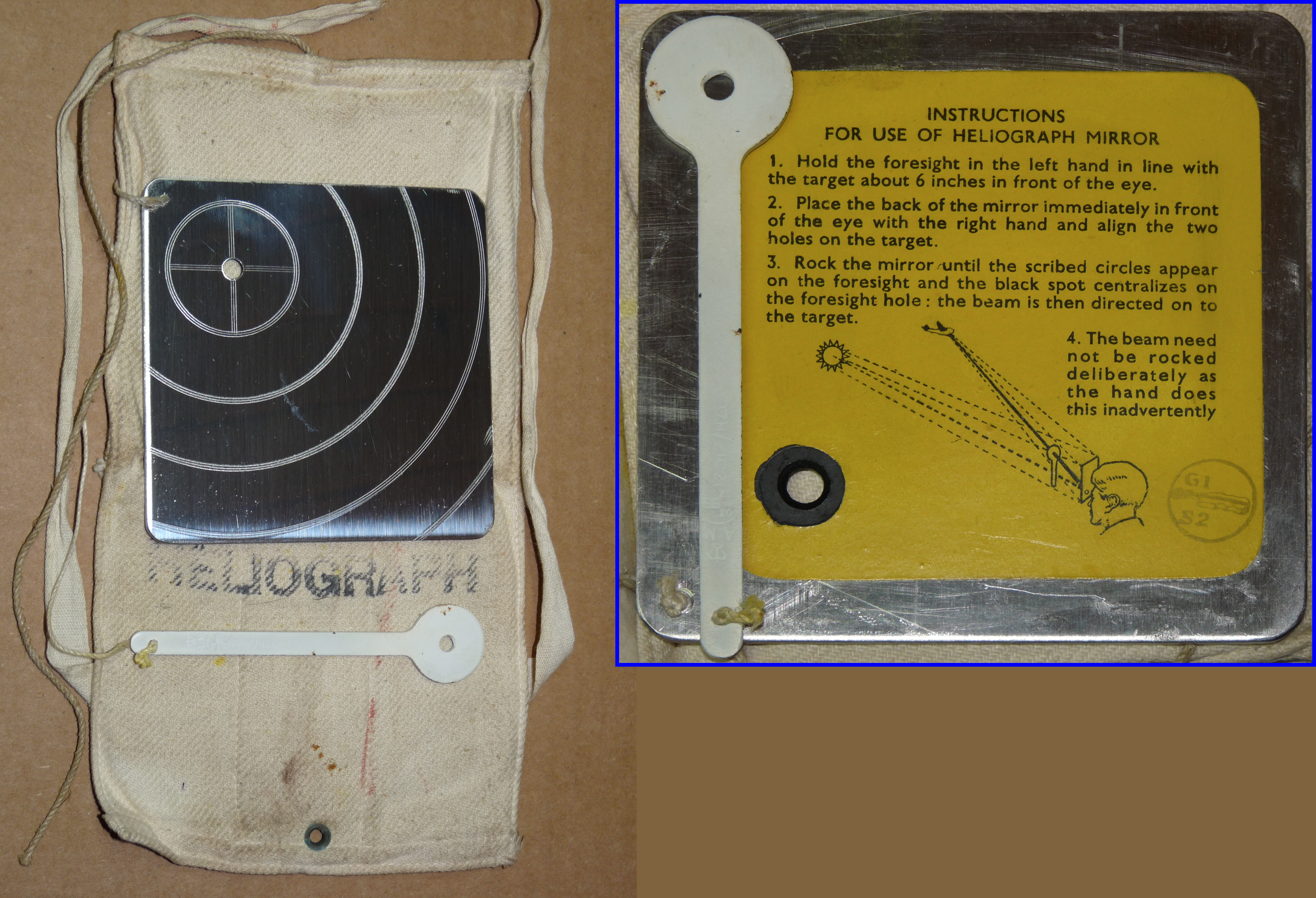
Fig. 5: Royal Air Force "Dinghy Heliograph" front and rear, 1943, 4"x4"

In England, the Royal Air Force conducted a comparison in late 1942 between a glass mirror manufactured for the tripod-mounted Army heliograph and several others, including the standard U.S. dinghy equipment - a 4-inch diameter circular disk of chrome-plated brass. The winning candidate chosen for production was a stainless steel mirror with a sighting hole which was blackened against stray reflection, and conical to allow off-axis viewing. A foresight paddle with a hole at one end was tethered to the mirror. The user looked through the mirror hole and paddle hole at the target, then tilted the mirror to put the "shadow spot" from the mirror hole in the paddle hole. The front of the mirror had scribed circles around the hole to create "shadow rings" to help the user locate the "shadow spot". The whole was packaged in a soft fabric case with separate compartments for the mirror and paddle, and the back of the mirror had instructions for use in both diagram and textual form. The instructions ended with the note: "The beam need not be deliberately rocked as the hand does this inadvertently." The sunbeams of the tripod-mounted heliographs the British military had used since the 1870s were also directed with the aid of a "shadow spot" on a foresight, and the issued signalling mirrors were stamped "HELIOGRAPH" on the fabric case. The production model was tested in February 1943. It was produced in both two inch and four inch versions. The front and back of a four-inch version is shown in Figure 5.

US Coast Guard testing indicated (Figure 2) that the performance of this mirror was worse than that of rearsight and reflex sight mirrors, and the US Coast Guard never certified this type of signalling mirror as acceptable for lifeboats. However these "heliograph-style" daylight signalling mirrors are common equipment in oceangoing lifeboat kits of other nations to the current day.

=== US first generation – plain metal disks – 1939 ===
Early in World War II, in November 1939, the US Navy BuAer was the first US aeronautical service to include a reflective device as life raft emergency equipment, a 4" diameter cadmium plated brass disk without any holes or other aiming aids. The specification was approved on 15 September 1939, exactly two weeks after the start of the war. In 1940, the plating was changed to chrome.

=== US 2nd generation – metal rearsights – 1942 ===
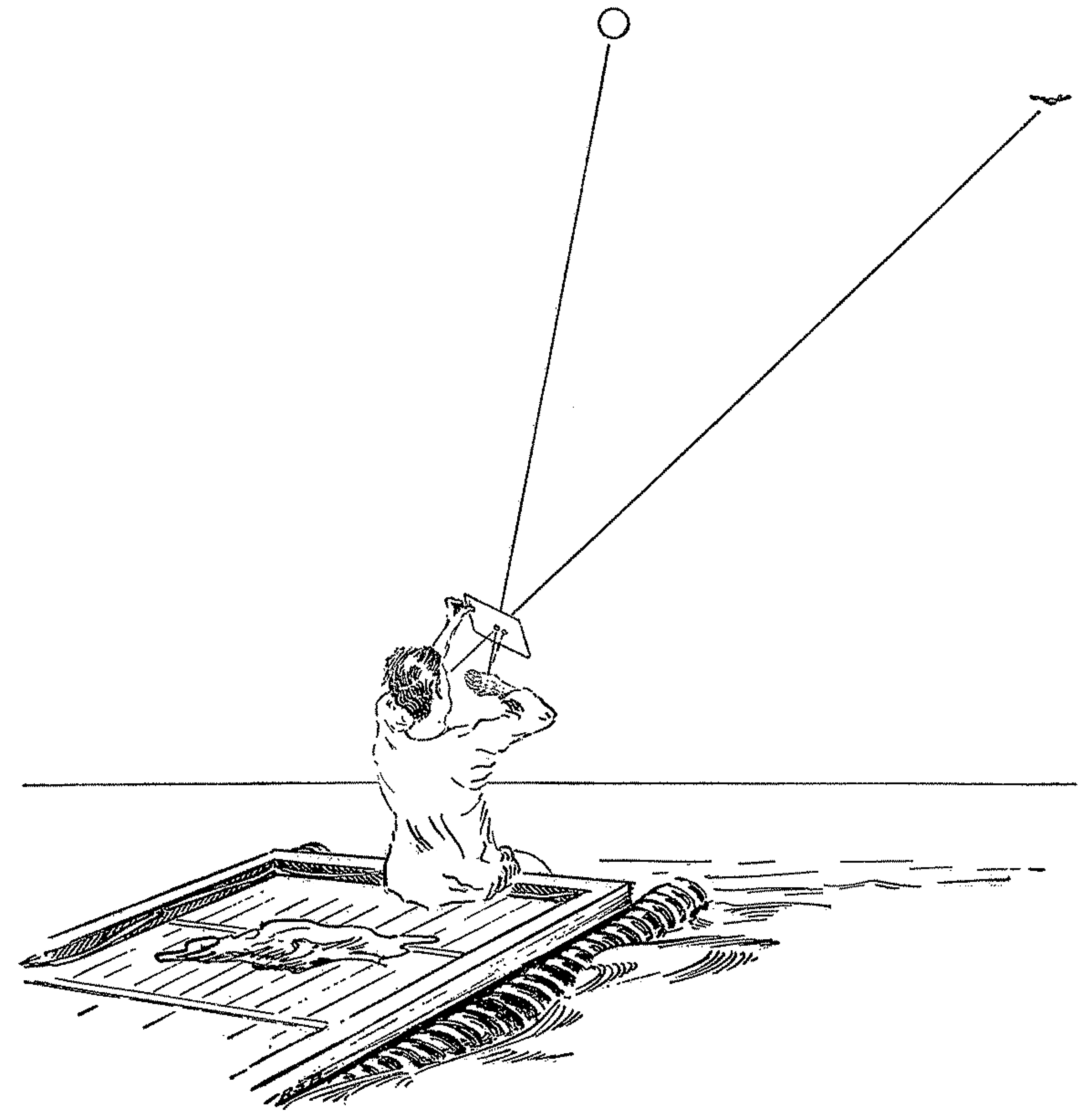
Fig. 6: Aiming a double-sided signalling mirror using the "rearsight" method - USCG Jan 1943

In the United States, in September 1942, at the direction of the Joint Chiefs of Staff, the US Coast Guard, OSS and National Inventors Council asked the National Bureau of Standards (NBS) for a method to accurately aim handheld daylight signalling mirrors. Within a few days, L.L. Young of the NBS invented the "rearsight" sighting technique, using a double-sided mirror with an opening in it.

The user looked through the opening at the target, caught the sunlight passing through the opening on their hand or body, and turned the mirror so the reflection of the sunlight spot on their hand or body seen in the rear mirror surface disappeared into the hole.

On 26 September 1942, the US Coast Guard published in the Federal Register the requirement that lifeboats in merchant vessels carry two stainless steel or other suitably polished metal mirrors having at least 20 square inches on each side, and wrapped in a water-proof container plainly marked "Signaling Mirrors" (46 CFR 153.6), and in January 1943, published instructions on using such mirrors by the "rearsight" method (Fig. 6).

Such double-sided metal signalling mirrors have been accepted by the US Coast Guard as meeting the requirements for daylight signalling mirrors in the lifeboards and liferafts of US merchant vessels from then to the present day.

On 1 February 1943, the US Navy BuAer provided the "rearsight" method instructions to all US Navy pilots and recommended that a 3/16 inch hole be drilled "in the center of the reflectors now stowed in the rafts and also those in stock".

=== US 3rd generation – "cross-in-glass" – mid-1943 ===
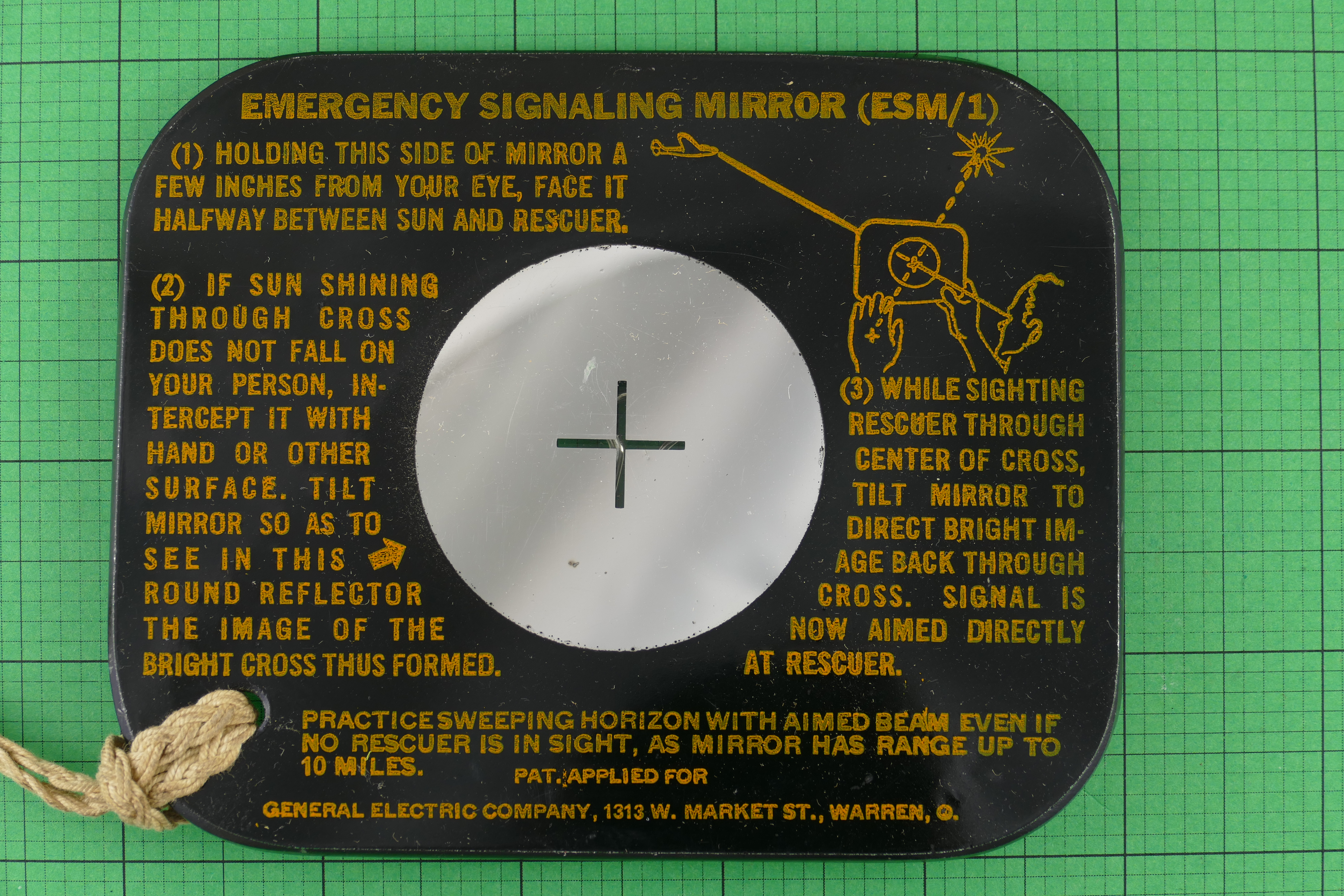
Fig. 7: U.S. Navy ESM/1 Rearsight Signalling Mirror, 1943, 4"x5"

Fig. 8: WW2 ESM/1 Training Film

Larry L. Young of the NBS worked with Wentworth M. Potter of General Electric to develop a tempered-glass version with cross-shaped opening and printed directions on the back, and with the OSS for a training film on the device (Figure 8). This resulted in the ESM/1 being issued in 1943. Over a million of the ESM/1 and its smaller successor, the ESM/2, were issued in World War 2. These replaced the brass disks in US Naval Aviation survival kits.

=== US 4th generation – reflex sight tabs – 1944 ===
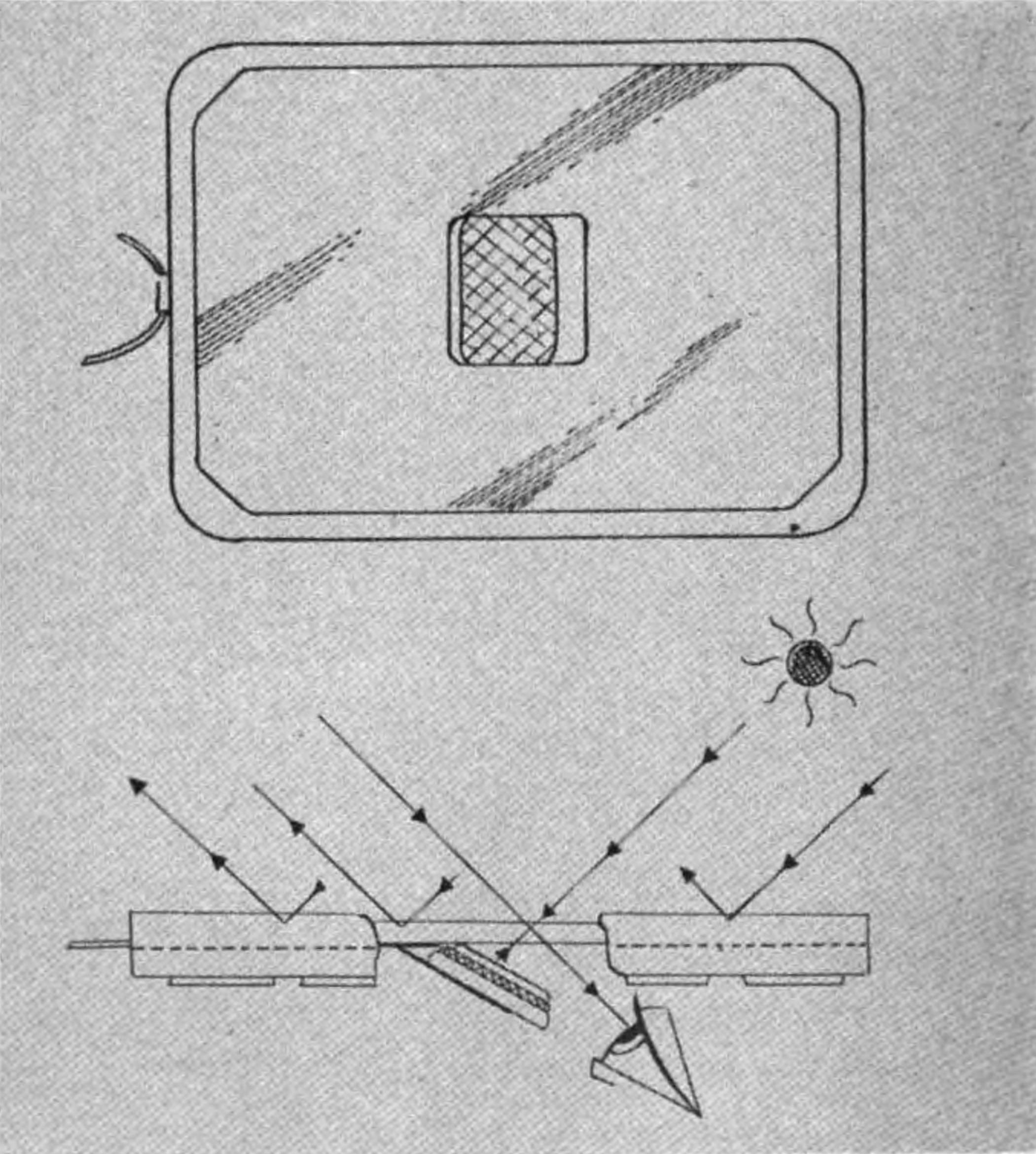
Fig. 9: Diagram showing how the reflex sight signal mirror aimer of C.H. Learned functioned

Users reported that the ESM/1 was too tiring to use for extended periods or in rough water so a suggestion was entertained from scoutmaster Charles Horace Learned of Carmel, California, who had invented a signalling mirror for his Scout troop in 1933. His suggestion used a retroreflective tab like a bicycle reflector to create a red virtual image of the sun in the direction of the reflected column of light from the mirror, like a modern red dot sight.

The principle of operation is shown in Figure 9. The light from the sun at right passes through an unsilvered opening in the mirror and strikes the red retroreflective tab at bottom left. That reflector returns the red component of the sunlight towards the sun, but a small fraction is reflected at the rear air-to-glass interface and front glass-to-air interface. This small red fraction is reflected towards the user's eye, in a direction equal and opposite to the column of light reflected by the mirror proper. The result is that the user sees a glowing red ball, apparently at infinity, in the direction of the reflected sunlight. By tilting the mirror, the user can then pass the red ball, and hence the main beam, across the target.

This type of sight, where a target image is superimposed on the user's view, is called a reflex sight. Independent tests by the US Coast Guard and Royal Air Force indicated that the flashes from naive users in liferafts were spotted far more often with the "reflex sight" than with the "foresight" and "rearsight" mirrors (Figure 2). These reflex sight mirrors began to replace the ESM/1 mirrors in US Naval Aviation survival kits in September 1944. While the "reflex sight" mirrors were better, as of March 1945 the Army Air Forces continued to use the ESM/1 & ESM/2 rearsight mirrors, and the Merchant Marine the stainless rearsight, despite both being difficult to aim in rough sea conditions

=== US 5th generation – red Scotchlite ring – 1945 ===
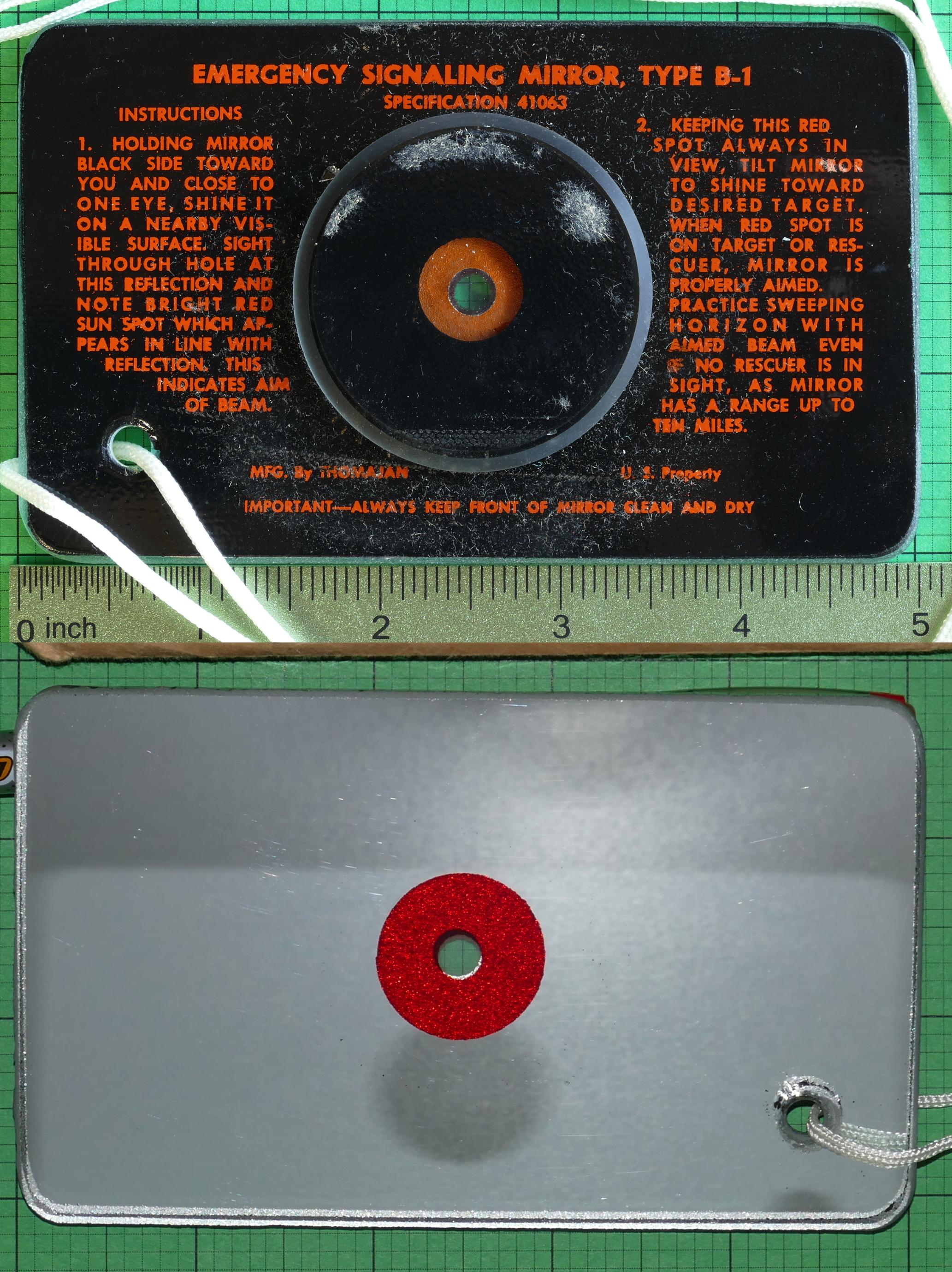
Fig. 10: Both sides of a 1940s Emergency Signaling Mirror, Type B-1 with red retroreflective reflex sight

C.H. Learned's retroreflective tab reflex sight required that the mirror be rotated about the line of sight so that the tab was opposite the sun. Richard S. Hunter of the NBS therefore developed a modification of Learned's reflex sight that used a ring of fabric coated with retroreflective beads (ScotchLite) and a red filter in a rear compartment in place of Learned's tab. This modification produced the red targeting dot at all angles of rotation about the mirror surface normal.

The US Army Air Force standardized these as the 3"x5" "Emergency Signaling Mirror, Type B-1" under specification No. 94–641063 on 4 March 1946, replacing the 4"x5" ESM/1 and 3"x5" ESM/2, but they did not reach the troops until the war ended. The US Navy accepted the "B-1" mirror as specification 18M8A on 3 September 1946, replacing the 18M8 specification for the Learned mirror of Sept. 1, 1944.

This type of mirror is used by the French Air Force to the current day in the form of the "Miroir de Signalisation SOS Type 643" (SOS Signal Mirror, Type 643).

=== US 6th generation – Mark 3 retroreflective mesh – 1949 ===
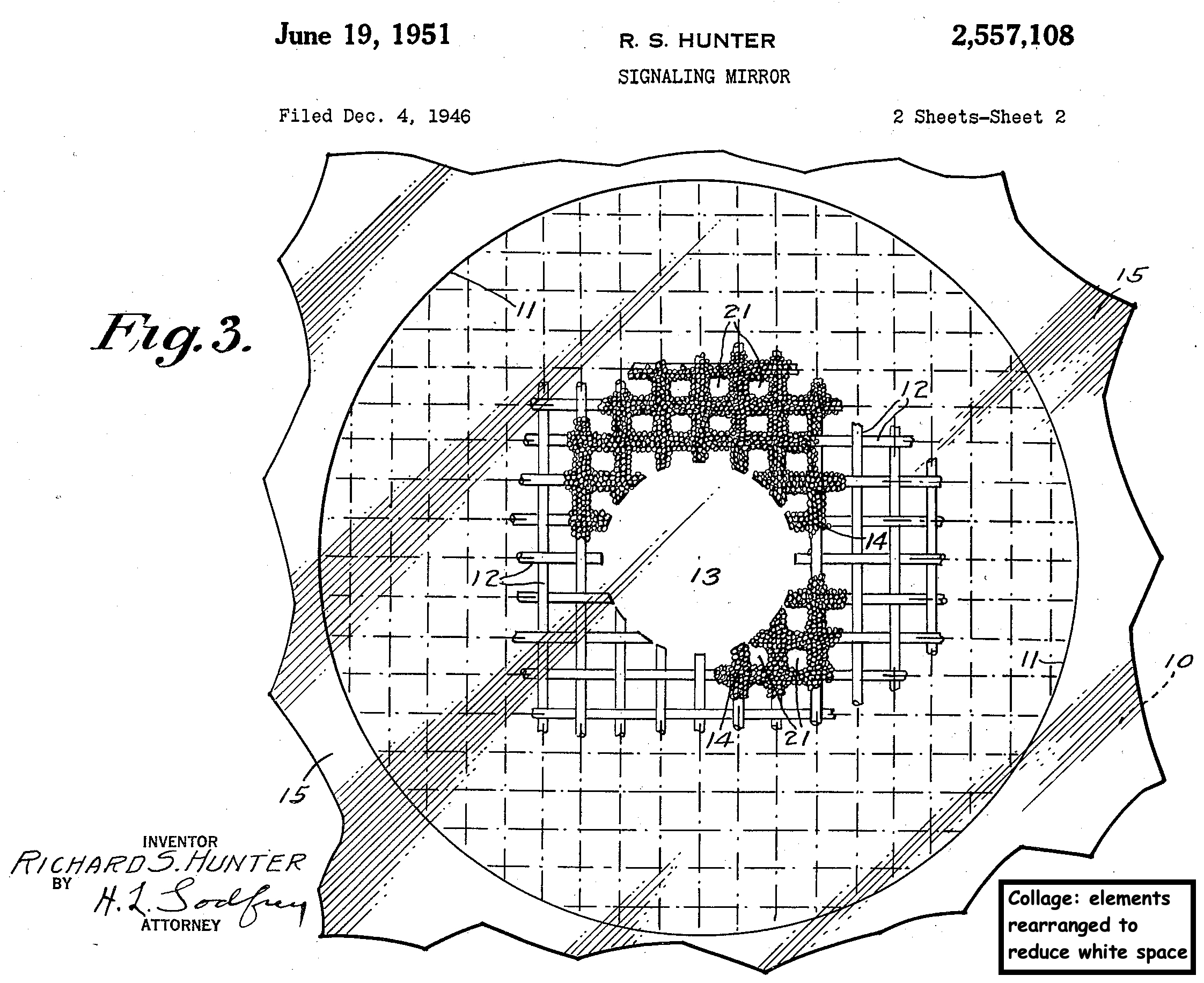
Fig. 11: Detailed diagram of the retroreflective mesh in the Mark 3 emergency signaling mirror reflex sight

Richard Hunter felt that the small circular opening in the Scotchlite mirrors restricted the user's view, and invented a new reflex sight that that sandwiched an annular ring of mesh coated with retroreflective beads between two layers of glass that "provides a materially enlarged field of view, due to many light transmitting screen mesh openings rather than a single opening in the aiming mechanism". After three years of testing, the "Mark 3" mirror was adopted in 1949.

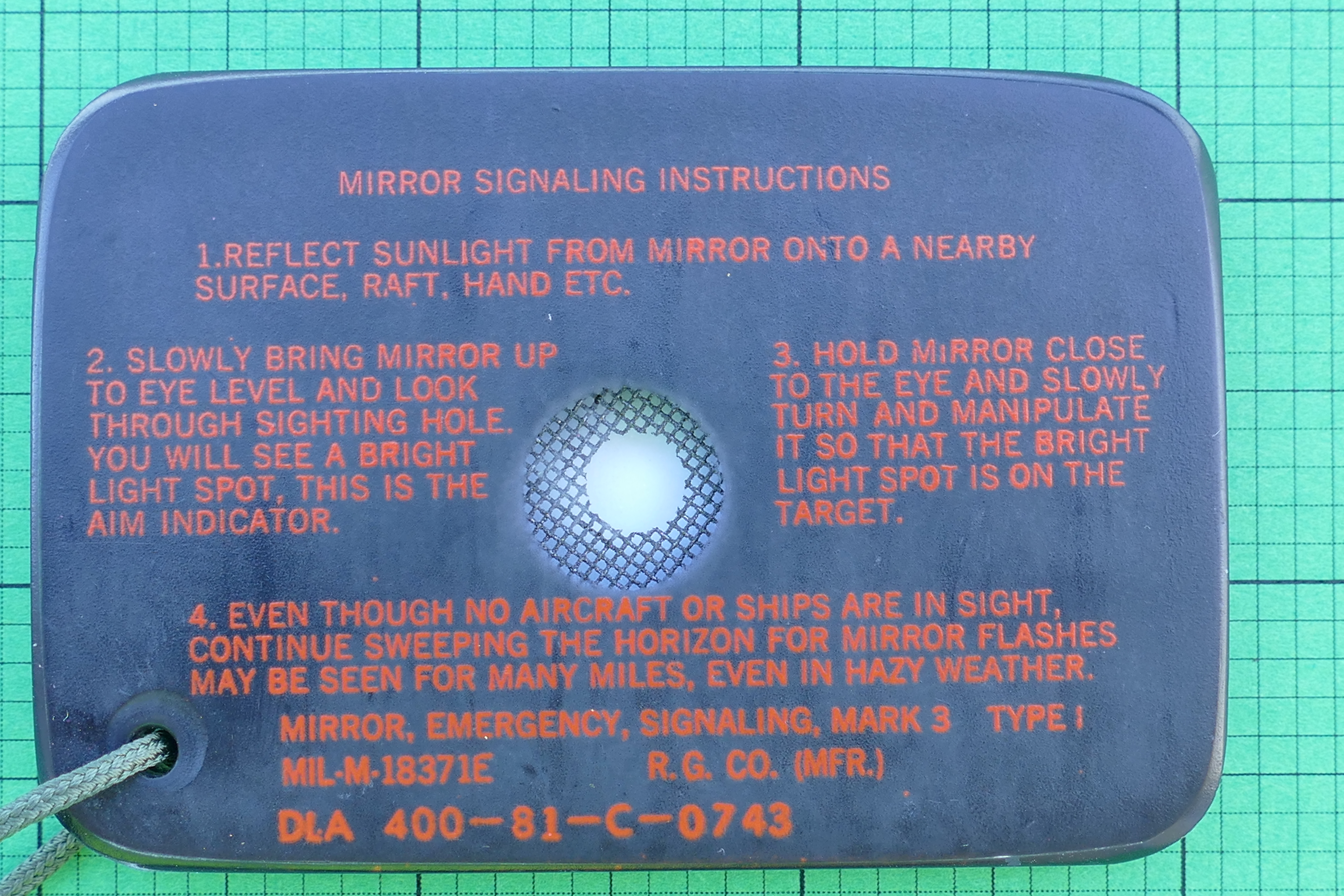
Fig 12: Back of US Military Issue signalling mirror, MIL-M-18371E Mark 3 Type 1

The Mark 3 mirror remains in use to the current day by all branches of the US military and the Royal Air Force. The US military specification was initially 23M5, then MIL-18371, and is now at the "E" version of the latter, or MIL-18371E, with two sizes: "Type 1", at 2"x3" (Figure 12) and "Type 2" at 3"x5". In 2022, the US Government ordered 39,307 of the "Type 1" and 7,030 of the "Type 2". The MIL-M-18371E is also used in the liferaft kits of commercial airliners as well, and sold to the general public.

== See also ==
- Heliotrope (instrument), Sun-reflecting mirrors used as optical beacons for surveyors
- Heliograph Tripod-mounted solar telegraphs
