= N.I. Lobachevsky Institute of Mathematics and Mechanics =

Russian University Department

- Other name: Институт математики и механики им. Н.И. Лобачевского
- Established: 2011; 15 years ago
- Address: 35 Ulitsa Kremlevskaya, Kazan 420008, Tatarstan, Russia
- Location: Kazan, Russia

N.I. Lobachevsky Institute of Mathematics and Mechanics - N.I. Lobachevsky Institute of Mathematics and Mechanics – one of Kazan Federal University’s Institutes. It was established in 2011 at the premises of the Faculty of Mechanics and Mathematics including N.G.Chebotarev Research Institute for Mathematics and Mechanics and the part of TSUHE’s Faculty of Mathematics. The Institute has Bachelor program, Master program, Postgraduate and Doctoral studies.

== History ==
In 1814 classical university was fully opened with the division of Physics and Mathematics as its part. In 1961 the Faculty of Mechanics and Mathematics became independent from the Faculty of Physics and Mathematics. In 1978 the Faculty of Computational Mathematics and Cybernetics was segregated from the Faculty of Mechanics and Mathematics. In 2011 Nikolai Lobachevsky Institute of Mathematics and Mechanics was established in KFU by merging the Faculty of Mechanics and Mathematics of Kazan University and Nikolai Chebotarev Research Institute of Mathematics and Mechanics. Johann Christian Martin Bartels is regarded as the founder of Kazan mathematical school. He was the teacher of outstanding scientists - N. I. Lobachevsky. A. F. Popov, F. M. Suvorov, A. V. Vasilyev, D. M. Sintsov, A. P. Kotelnikov worked at Kazan University in pre-revolutionary period. Corresponding members of the USSR’s Academy of Science, N. G. Chebotaryev, N. G., Chetaev, academicians of the Ukrainian and Belorussian SSRs’ AS, A. Z. Petrov and F. D. Gachov, worked there in post-revolutionary period.

== Structure ==
Division of Mathematics:

- Department of General Mathematics
- Department of Algebra and Mathematical Logic
- Department of Geometry
- Department of Mathematical Analysis
- Department of Differential Equations
- Department of Theory of Functions and Approximations

Division of Mechanics:

- Department of Theoretical Mechanics
- Department of Aerohydromeachanics

Division of Pedagogical Education:

- Department of Higher Mathematics and Mathematical Modeling
- Department of Theories and Technologies of Mathematics and Information Technology Teaching

Nikolai Chebotarev Research Centre

== Education ==
The Institute provides the following Bachelor programs: Mathematics, Mathematics and Computer Science, Mechanics and Mathematical Modeling, as well as in three majors of Pedagogical Education. Some majors are offered as Master programs: Algebra, Geometry and Topology, Complex Analysis, Mechanics of Deformable Solids, Fluid Mechanics, Theory of Functions and Information Technology, PDEs, Functional Analysis, Pedagogical Education: Information Technology in Physical and Mathematical Education; Mathematics, Informatics and Information Technologies in Education. The institute offers doctoral programs according to all Russian Higher Attestation Committee list of specialties in the sphere of mathematical studies.
