= Johann Benzenberg =

German astronomer, geologist, and physicist

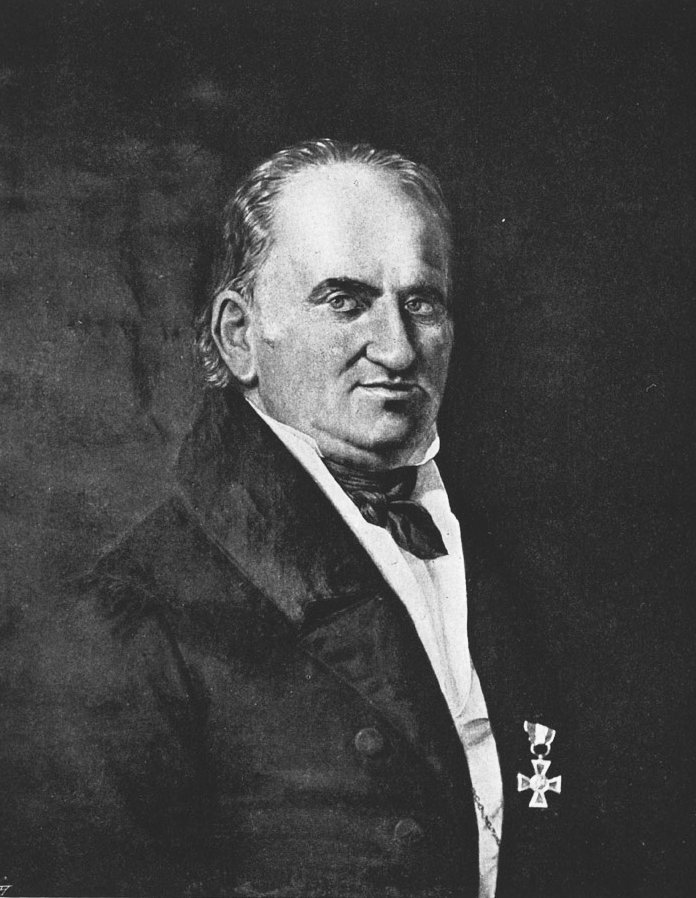
- Born: 5 May 1777; Elberfeld
- Died: 7 June 1846 (aged 69); Düsseldorf-Bilk
- Resting place: Schöllerweg, Wuppertal
- Education: University of Duisburg
- Spouse: Charlotte Platzhoff

Johann Friedrich Benzenberg (5 May 1777 – 7 June 1846) was a German astronomer, geologist, and physicist.

== Biography ==
Benzenberg was born near Elberfeld, Germany on 5 May 1777 to Heinrich Benzenberg and Johanna Elisabeth. He married Charlotte Platzhoff in 1807. After studying theology at Herborn and Marburg, he travelled to Göttingen where he became interested in science through attending lectures by Georg Christoph Lichtenberg and Abraham Gotthelf Kästner. Benzenberg obtained a PhD from the University of Duisburg in 1800 and became a professor of mathematics at the women's college of Düsseldorf in 1805. After the Napoleonic occupation of Germany he immigrated to Switzerland where he became interested in politics. Benzenberg's interest in politics led him to write extensively on issues such as the constitution of Prussia. In 1844 Benzenberg built a private observatory, the Düsseldorf-Bilk Observatory, in Bilk, which he later donated to the city along with a grant to pay for a resident astronomer.

In 1798, whilst still a student at the University of Göttingen, Benzenberg and Heinrich Wilhelm Brandes studied the atmospheric altitude of meteors, collecting the first evidence that they were inside the atmosphere. Later, in 1802 and 1804, Benzenberg helped prove the Earth's rotation by conducting experiments originally suggested by Isaac Newton; dropping balls from a height.
