= Bernhard Friedrich Thibaut =

German mathematician

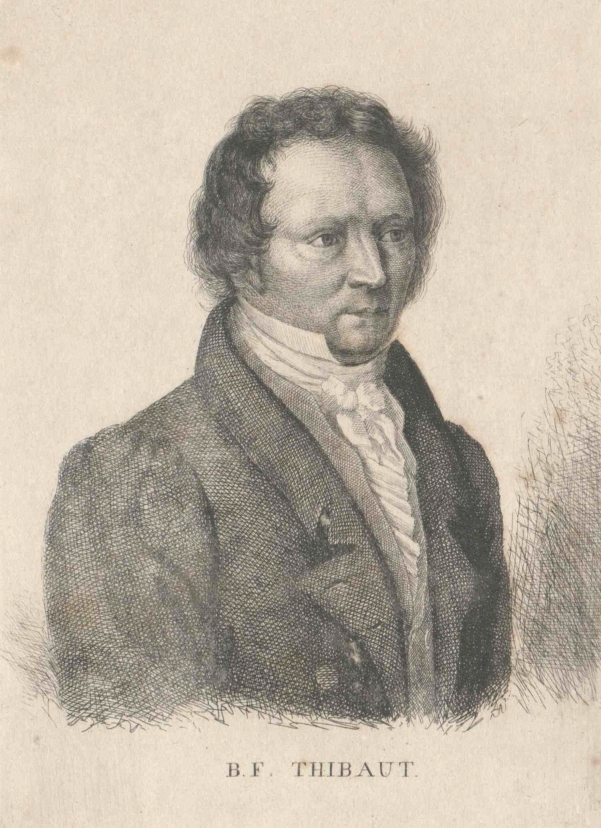
- Born: 22 December 1775; Harburg, Electorate of Hanover
- Died: 4 November 1832 (aged 56); Göttingen, Kingdom of Hanover

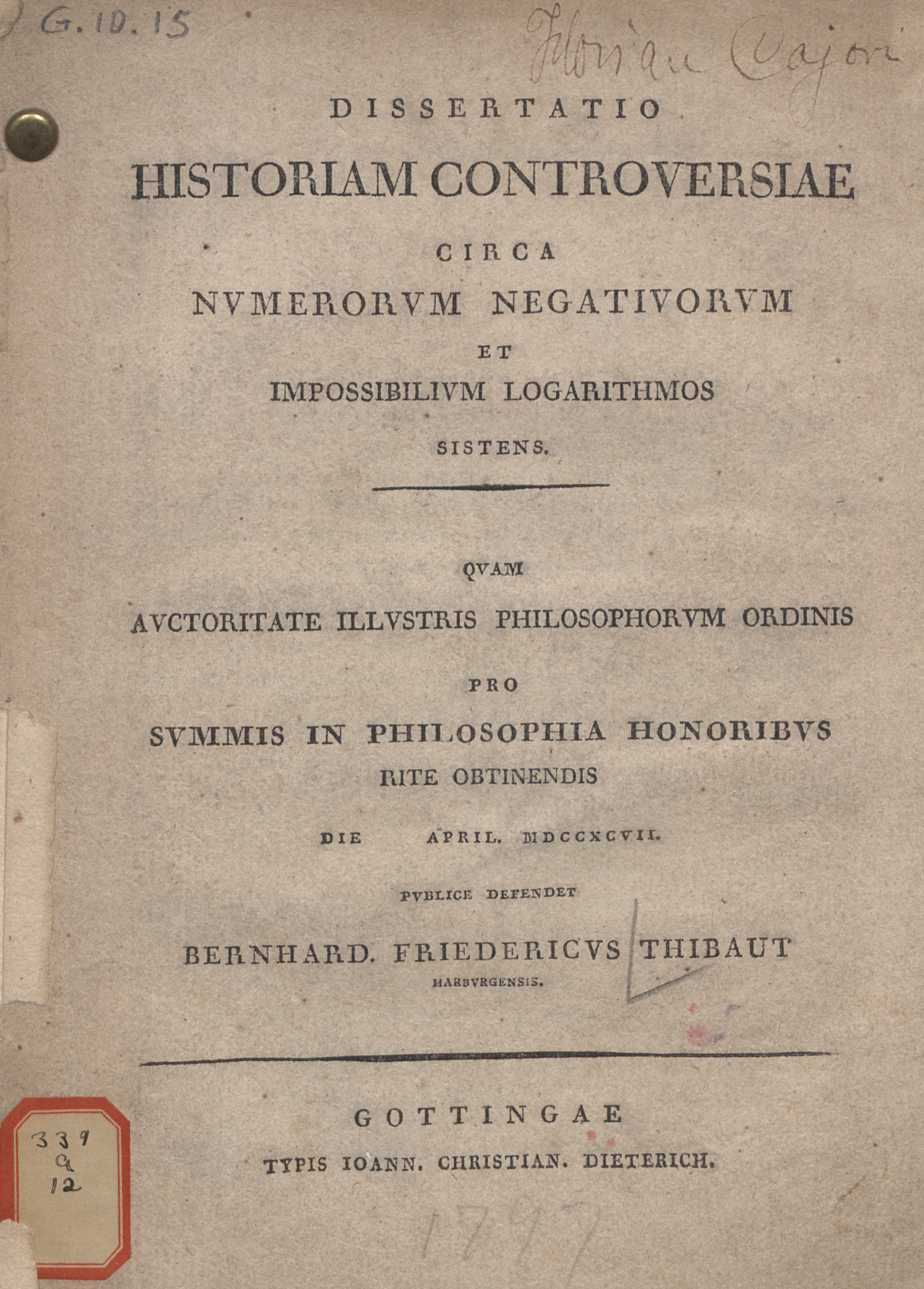
Dissertatio historiam controversiae circa numerorum negativorum et impossibilium logarithmos sistens, 1797

Bernhard Friedrich Thibaut (22 December 1775 – 4 November 1832) was a German mathematician.

He was the younger brother of the famous jurist Anton Friedrich Justus Thibaut. He studied at the University of Göttingen along with Georg Christoph Lichtenberg, Johann Beckmann, and Abraham Gotthelf Kästner. In 1797 he became lecturer (Privatdozent) in Göttingen. In 1802 he became extraordinary and in 1805 ordinary professor of philosophy. Mathematics were his favourite field of lessons, and he was well known as a brilliant lecturer, in contrast to Carl Friedrich Gauss, who was professor for astronomy in Göttingen since 1807 and disliked giving lessons. Thibaut finally became professor of mathematics in 1828.

Since 1804, Thibaut was an ordinary member of the Academy of Science in Göttingen.

== Works ==
- Thibaut, Bernhard Friedrich (1797). Dissertatio historiam controversiae circa numerorum negativorum et impossibilium logarithmos sistens (in Latin). Gottingae: Johann Christian Dieterich. (Doctoral thesis)
