= Johann Friedrich Pfaff =

German mathematician (1765–1825)

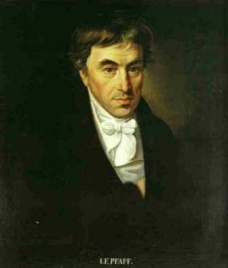
- Portrait, c. 1820
- Born: 22 December 1765; Stuttgart, Holy Roman Empire
- Died: 21 April 1825 (aged 59); Halle, German Confederation (Prussia)
- Education: University of Göttingen
- Known for: Pfaffians; Pfaffian constraint Pfaffian function Pfaffian system Pfaffian orientation
- Scientific career
- Fields: Mathematics
- Workplaces: University of Helmstedt; Halle University
- Doctoral advisor: Abraham Kästner; Johann Elert Bode
- Doctoral students: Carl Friedrich Gauss; August Möbius; Karl Mollweide
- Other notable students: Johann Christian Martin Bartels; Heinrich Christian Schumacher; Johann August Grunert [de] Christian Ludwig Gerling; Eduard von Schrader [de] Friedrich Karl Wex [de]

Johann Friedrich Pfaff (sometimes spelled Friederich; 22 December 1765 – 21 April 1825) was a German mathematician. He is best known for his work on differential equations and as Carl Friedrich Gauss's doctoral advisor.

== Biography ==
Johann Friedrich Pfaff was born 22 December 1765 to Friedrich Burkhard Pfaff (1738-1817) and Mary Magdalena Pfaff (née Brand) in Stuttgart. He was one of seven sons and five daughters.

Pfaff attended the Hohe Karlsschule from 1774 to 1785, where his classmates included Carl Friedrich Kielmeyer and Ludwig Schubart, and where he met his lifelong friend, Friedrich Schiller. His mathematical talent was noticed early on by his teachers and he came to the attention of Duke Charles Eugene, who sponsored his further studies. In 1785 he went to Göttingen, where he studied mathematics under Abraham Gotthelf Kästner and completed his prize-winning essay on astronomy. In 1787 he went to Berlin and studied astronomy under J. E. Bode; there he completed his first notable mathematical work, on series summation. While in Berlin, Pfaff joined Friedrich Nicolai's circle of enlighteners.

In 1788, on the recommendation of Georg Christoph Lichtenberg, Pfaff became professor of mathematics at the University of Helmstedt. His inaugural dissertation investigates the calculation of differentials. His subsequent mathematical work at Helmstedt included: nine articles in Carl Hindenburg's journals, notably two linking arithmetic and analysis, his treatise on analysis, a paper independently deriving Vandermonde's identity and proving Saalschütz's theorem, and a paper solving for the largest ellipse that can be inscribed in a quadrilateral, a problem posed by Gauss.

Pfaff was the official doctoral advisor to Carl Friedrich Gauss, who lived with him in Helmstedt in 1798, the one year of Gauss's residence at the university. Another notable acquaintance was Alexander von Humboldt, whom Pfaff recommended to Göttingen.

While at Helmstedt, Pfaff was active outside of mathematics too, collaborating with Gottfried Gabriel Bredow on historical works. When the university's finances were in trouble, he wrote an essay defending it, preventing its closure. Pfaff served Helmstedt loyally, administering the university's pension fund for widows and refusing appointments at both Göttingen, for which he proposed Gauss, and Dorpat, for which he proposed his brother; for his loyalty he was appointed Hofrat by the Duke of Brunswick.

On 8 November 1803, Pfaff married Sophie Wilhelmine Caroline Brand (b. 28 March 1784), his maternal cousin.

When Helmstedt was abolished in 1810, Pfaff moved to the University of Halle, where he remained for the rest of his career. In 1812, on the death of Georg Simon Klügel, Pfaff became director of the observatory at Halle. While at Halle, he had several students, most notably August Möbius.

At Halle, Pfaff completed his most significant work, on partial differential equations of the first order Pfaffian systems, as they are now called, which became part of the theory of differential forms. Despite a favorable review from Gauss on publication, it was not until a later assessment by Jacobi in 1827 that his work was widely recognized. Pfaff died 20 April 1825 in Halle of apoplexy.

Over his career, Pfaff joined several major academic societies, including the Russian Academy of Sciences, the Göttingen Academy of Sciences, the Prussian Academy of Sciences, and the French Academy of Sciences.

=== Family ===
Pfaff and his wife had two children, Carl Pfaff (b. 1 February 1805), who became a professor of philosophy and history at Halle, and Ludwig Pfaff (1811-1829).

Two of Pfaff's brothers also became notable academics: Johann Wilhelm Andreas Pfaff was a professor of pure and applied mathematics, and Christoph Heinrich Pfaff was a professor of medicine, physics and chemistry.

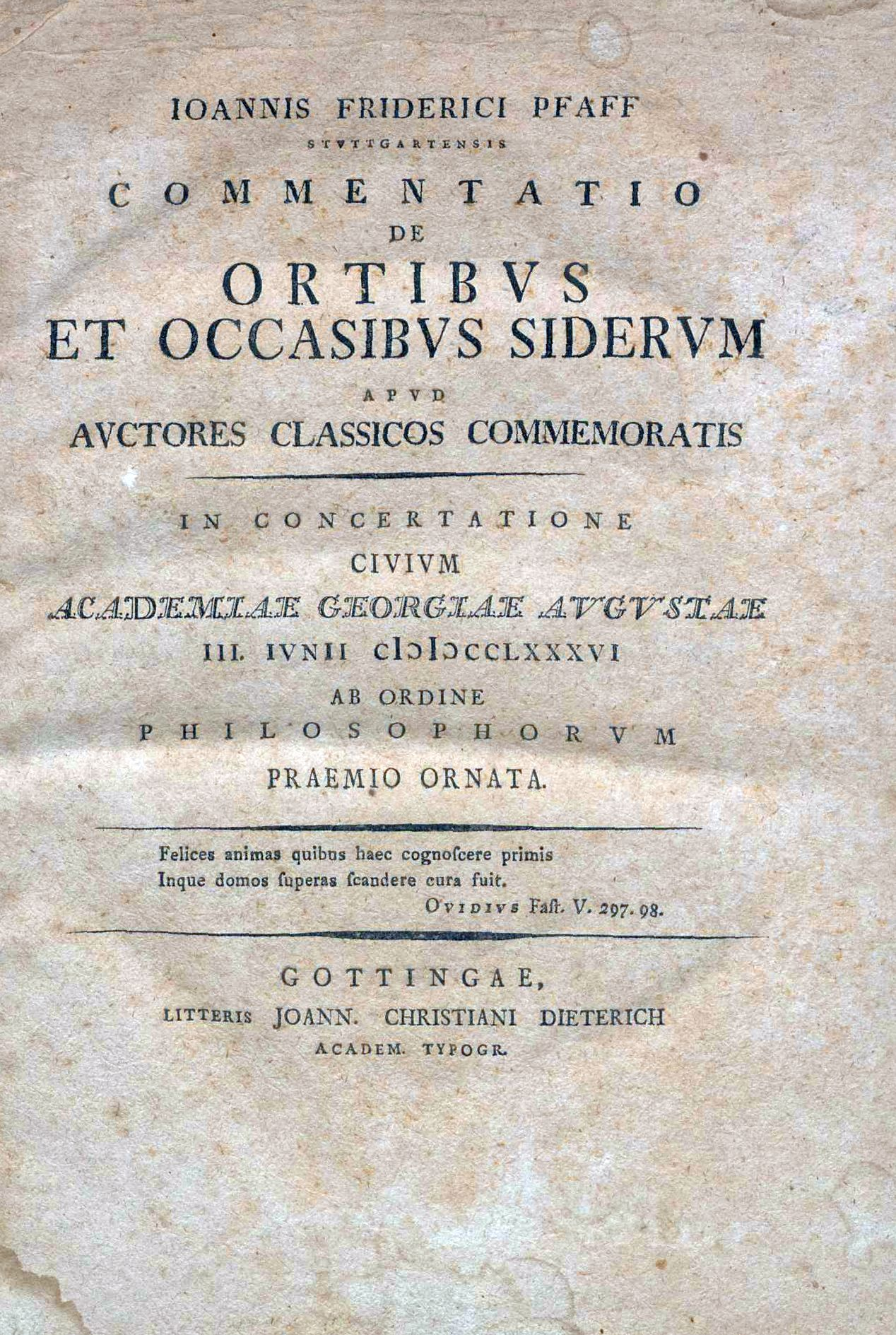
Commentatio de ortibus et occasibus siderum apud auctores classicos commemoratis, 1786

== Legacy ==
They asked Laplace who, in his opinion, was the greatest mathematician of Germany. "It's Pfaff," he answered. - "I thought," the questioner replied, "that Gauss was superior to him." - "But," exclaimed Laplace, "you're asking me who is the greatest mathematician of Germany, and Gauss is the greatest mathematician of Europe.

== See also ==
- Pfaffian
