= Enno Dirksen =

German mathematician (1788–1850)

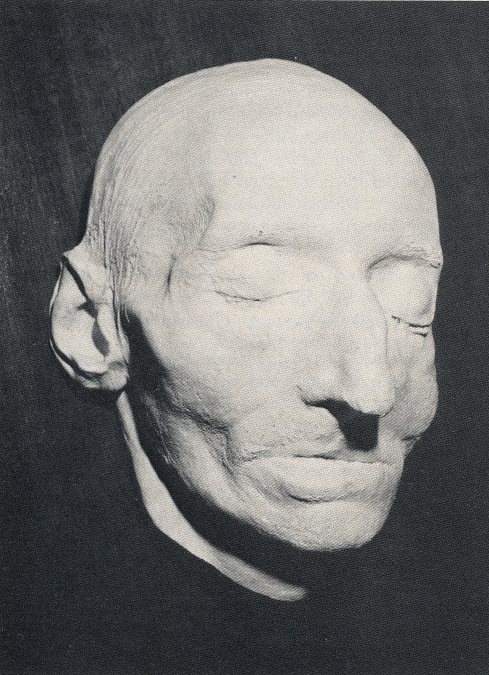
- death mask of Dirksen
- Born: 3 January 1788; Eilsum, Prussia
- Died: 16 July 1850 (aged 62); Paris, France
- Education: Göttingen University
- Scientific career
- Workplaces: Berlin University
- Doctoral advisor: Johann Tobias Mayer; Bernhard Friedrich Thibaut
- Doctoral students: Carl Gustav Jacob Jacobi; Adolph Göpel; Eduard Heine

Enno Dirksen (3 January 1788 – 16 July 1850) was a German mathematician at the University of Berlin.

== Early life ==
Enno Dirksen was born on 3 January 1788 in Eilsum, Prussia, to Dirk Heeren Dirksen and Elisabeth Berends. Between 1803 and 1807, he obtained private lessons in mathematics, physics, astronomy and navigation from a teacher at the Emden Navigation School. Following this, he taught at local schools in Hatzum (until 1815) and in Hinte.

== Career ==
On the suggestion of Jabbo Oltmanns, he enrolled at Göttingen University in 1817 to study mathematics. He pursued his doctorate there advised by Johann Tobias Mayer and Bernhard Friedrich Thibaut.

He went to Berlin in 1820 and started working for the astronomer Johann Elert Bode. He habilitated at the University of Berlin's mathematics department as an expert in astronomy. In August 1820, he was appointed by the Prussian Ministry as an extraordinary professor in the university. Four years later, in June 1824, he was appointed as a full Professor of Mathematics. The noted mathematician Carl Gustav Jacob Jacobi was one of the students he advised.

He was an elected member of the Prussian Academy of Sciences from 1825.

He retired from teaching in 1848–49 due to illness, and moved to Paris. He died there on 16 July 1850.
