= Johann Wilhelm Andreas Pfaff =

German mathematician and professor (1774–1835)

Johann Wilhelm Andreas Pfaff (5 December 1774 – 26 June 1835) was professor of pure and applied mathematics successively at Dorpat, Nuremberg, Würzburg and Erlangen. He was a brother of Johann Friedrich Pfaff, a mathematician; and of Christian Heinrich Pfaff, a physician and physicist.
