= Jacob Philadelphia =

German magician, physicist, astrologer and alchemist (1735–1795)

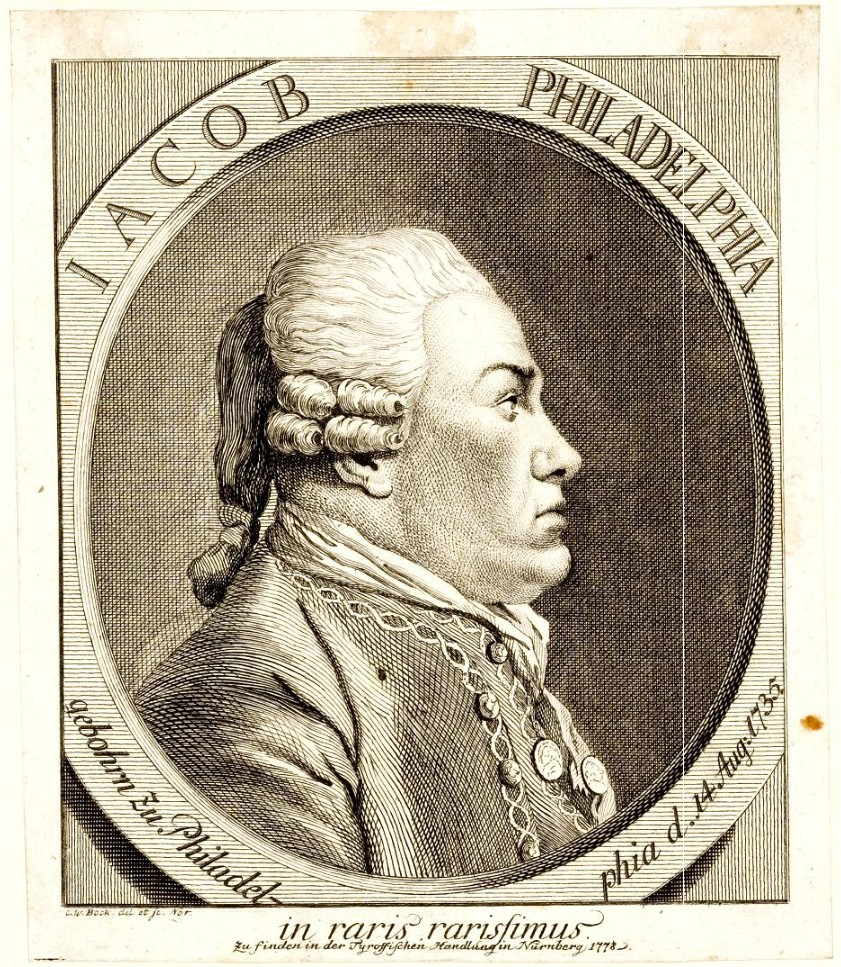
- Image of the magician/scientist Jacob Philadelphia
- Born: Jacob Meyer; August 14, 1735
- Died: 1795 (aged 59–60); Köthen, Saxony
- Notable work: Little Treatise on Strange and Suitable Feats

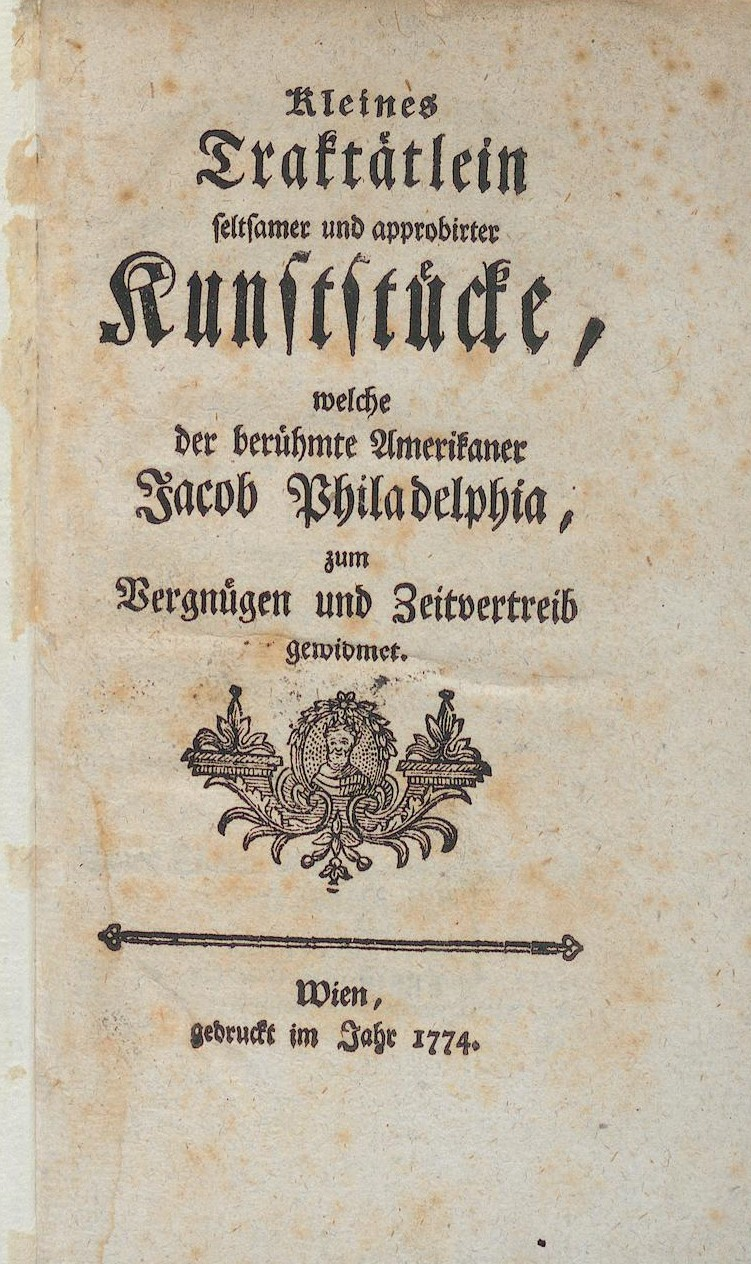
Kunststücke (1774)

Jacob Philadelphia (born Jacob Meyer; 14 August 1735 – 1785) was a German magician, physicist, astrologer and alchemist.

== Biography ==
According to Daniel Jütte, he was born Jacob Meyer probably in Wulfen in 1734, although he claimed to have been born in Philadelphia, though other sources report that he was in fact, American-born. Dr Christopher Witt, the associate of Johannes Kelpius, was chiefly responsible for his education. Meyer's patron in England was Prince Henry, Duke of Cumberland and Strathearn, for whom he performed astrology, magic, and alchemy.

He was of Jewish descent, whose family immigrated from South America. When he converted to Christianity, Jacob Meyer took the name of Jacob Philadelphia in homage to the home city of the American scientist and statesman Benjamin Franklin. He was also known by the names Meyer Philadelphia and Philadelphus Philadelphia. Meyer became a member of the occult Rosicrucian order. After the death of his patron in 1756, Meyer began to perform in public. He exhibited his skills in Ireland, Portugal, and Spain. In 1771, he performed in St. Petersburg for Catherine II of Russia. Also, in Constantinople, he had Sultan Mustapha III as an audience. The year 1773 found him chasing away ghosts for Kaiser Joseph II, Holy Roman Emperor in Vienna at a charge of 300 Thalers.

In Potsdam and Berlin, he had difficulty with Frederick the Great, who was alarmed after Meyer read his mind. While at Frederick's court he made proposals for Prussia to open trade relations with the United States, but Frederick had several concerns about engaging with American agents, including prevailing anti-Jewish sentiment. Friedrich was also averse to Meyer's Rosicrucianism and subsequently banished the magician from Prussia.

In James Randi's view, Meyer was probably the "first American-born...magician to attain any fame". He was an early pioneer of phantasmagoria, a performance magic show with a focus on the appearance of ghostly figures. His shows involved "magic lantern, mirror effects, and various magnetic and electrical (usually high-voltage) demonstrations"

The Little Treatise on Strange and Suitable Feats was written by Meyer in 1774. In 1758, he toured England. Although he presented himself as being a scientist, many took him for a magician. In 1777 he refused to lecture in Göttingen because of an extravagant, satirical poster campaign by Georg Christoph Lichtenberg who libeled him as being a magician and miracle-worker. Among other things, the poster was designed to make people think that they would be forced into harmful situations if they attended the lecture. Lichtenberg's Avertissement placard became widely known and damaged Meyer's career. His final lecture was given in 1781 in Switzerland. In 1783, made a business proposition involving the use of occult powers to Frederick the Great, who declined the offer.

Meyer retired in Köthen, Germany, and died at the turn of the century

== Biographical novel ==
A biographical novel has been written by Marion Philadelphia in German about the life of Jacob Philadelphia. Its title is Der Gaukler der Könige (The Conjurer of Kings).

== See also ==
- List of magicians
- Georg Christoph Lichtenberg
- Lichtenberg's Avertissement
