= Christoph Heinrich Pfaff =

German scientist (1773–1852)

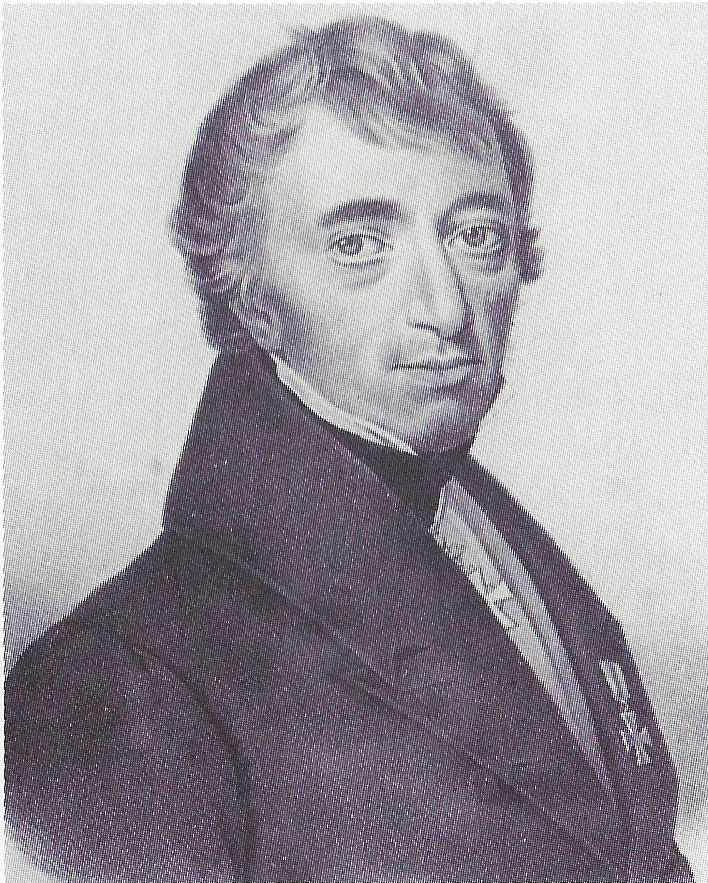
Christoph Heinrich Pfaff (1773–1852)

Christoph Heinrich Pfaff (2 March 1773 in Stuttgart – 24 April 1852 in Kiel, Holstein) was a German physician, chemist and physicist.

== Biography ==
He graduated as a physician at the Karlsschule in Stuttgart in 1793, where he studied under Carl Friedrich Kielmeyer and became good friends with Georges Cuvier. He then went to Göttingen, where he published the results of his galvanic inquiries in Ueber thierische Electricität und Reizbarkeit ("On animal electricity and susceptibility to stimulus"). In 1797 he became an associate professor at the University of Kiel, and in 1802 was made professor of chemistry, physics and medicine there with rank at the same time as a member of the medical faculty. He then directed his attention particularly to pharmaceutical chemistry, and was thus led to the composition of his most important work, System der Materia Medica nach chemischen Principien ("System of materia medica using chemical principles", 1808–24). Among other writings of his are:

- Ueber und gegen den thierichen Magnetismus ("Animal magnetism exposed and opposed", 1807).
- Handbuch der analytischen Chemie ("Handbook of analytical chemistry," 1824–25).
- Der Electromagnetismus (1824).
- Parallele der chemischen Theorie und der voltaischen Contacttheorie der galvanischen Kette ("Parallels between chemical theory and the voltaic contact theory of galvanic chains", 1845).

His brothers Johann Friedrich Pfaff and Johann Wilhelm Andreas Pfaff were noted mathematicians.
