= Johann Tobias Mayer =

German physicist (1752–1830)

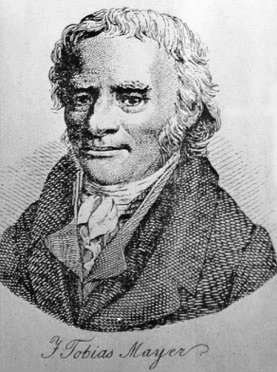
- Born: 5 May 1752; Göttingen, Electorate of Hanover
- Died: 30 November 1830 (aged 78); Göttingen, Kingdom of Hanover
- Scientific career
- Doctoral advisor: Abraham Gotthelf Kästner; Georg Christoph Lichtenberg
- Doctoral students: Johann Schweigger; Enno Dirksen

Johann Tobias Mayer (5 May 1752 – 30 November 1830) was a German physicist.

== Personal and professional life ==
Mayer, born in Göttingen in the Electorate of Hanover, was the first child of the astronomer Tobias Mayer and his wife Maria. The elder Mayer, a well-known Göttingen professor of geography, physics, and astronomy, died in 1762, when Johann was only ten.

Johann Tobias Mayer studied theology and philosophy since 1769 at the Georg-August University of Göttingen (founded 1737) under Abraham Gotthelf Kästner and later also with Georg Christoph Lichtenberg. After graduating in 1773, Mayer worked as a lecturer in mathematics and as an astronomer. On 17 November 1779, he was called to the University of Altdorf, where he worked from 1780 to 1786. He later taught mathematics and physics at Friedrich-Alexander-University, Erlangen-Nuremberg, and in 1799, he succeeded Lichtenberg at Göttingen. The mathematician Enno Dirksen was one of his doctoral students.

Mayer was well known for his mathematics and natural science textbooks. The textbook Anfangsgründe der Naturlehre zum Behuf der Vorlesungen über die Experimental-Physik from 1801 was the most influential of its time in the German-speaking countries. Mayer's research in experimental physics and astronomy was published in Annalen der Physik.

Mayer and his wife Johanna had five children. Mayer died in Göttingen.

== The Leonardo da Vinci Proof of the Pythagorean Theorem ==
A proof of the Pythagorean theorem ascribed to Leonardo da Vinci is now claimed to have been authored by Mayer in 1772.

== See also ==
- Lorentz force
