= Johann Christian Martin Bartels =

German mathematician (1769–1836)

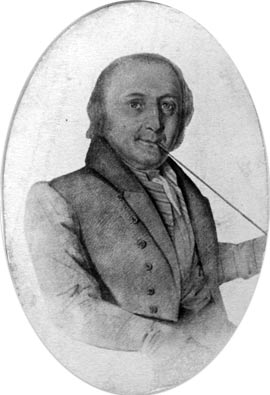
- Born: 12 August 1769; Braunschweig, Duchy of Brunswick-Lüneburg
- Died: 20 December 1836 (aged 67); Dorpat, Russian Empire
- Education: University of Helmstedt; University of Göttingen
- Scientific career
- Fields: Geometry
- Workplaces: University of Jena; University of Kazan
- Academic advisors: Johann Friedrich Pfaff; Abraham Gotthelf Kästner
- Notable students: Nikolai Lobachevsky

Johann Christian Martin Bartels (12 August 1769 – 20 December [O.S. 8 December] 1836) was a German mathematician. He was the tutor of Carl Friedrich Gauss in Braunschweig and the educator of Nikolai Lobachevsky at the University of Kazan in Russia.

== Biography ==
Bartels was born in Braunschweig, in the Duchy of Brunswick-Lüneburg (now part of Lower Saxony, Germany), the son of pewterer Heinrich Elias Friedrich Bartels and his wife Johanna Christine Margarethe Köhler. In his childhood he showed a great interest in mathematics. In 1783 he was employed as an assistant to the teacher Büttner in the Katherinenschule in Braunschweig. He became acquainted with Carl Friedrich Gauss there and encouraged his talent and recommended him to the Duke of Brunswick who awarded Gauss a fellowship to the Collegium Carolinum (now Technische Universität Braunschweig). A friendship developed between Gauss and Bartels and they corresponded between 1799 and 1823.

From 23 August 1788 he was a visitor at the Collegium Carolinum in Braunsschweig.

On 23 October 1791 Bartels studied mathematics under Johann Friedrich Pfaff in Helmstedt and Abraham Gotthelf Kästner in Göttingen. In the winter semester of 1793/1794 he studied Experimental Physics, Astronomy, Meteorology and Geology under Georg Christoph Lichtenberg.

In 1800 he worked in Switzerland as Professor of Mathematics in Reichenau (Canton Graubünden). In 1801 he was active in the cantonal school in Aarau. He married Anna Magdalena Saluz from Chur in 1802. The University of Jena promoted him to the Faculty of Philosophy in 1803.

In 1807 he was invited to join the University of Kazan by the founder Stepan Jakowlewitsch Rumowski (1734–1812), and went there in 1808 where he was appointed to the chair of Mathematics. During his twelve years tenure he lectured on the History of Mathematics, Higher Arithmetic, Differential and Integral Calculus, Analytical Geometry and Trigonometry, Spherical Trigonometry, Analytical Mechanics and Astronomy. During this time he taught Nikolai Ivanovich Lobachevsky.

In 1821 he moved to the University of Dorpat, now Tartu, Estonia, where he founded the Centre for Differential geometry. He remained at Dorpat until his death. He was appointed Privy Councillor in 1823. From 1826 he was a corresponding member of the St. Petersburg Academy of Science. He was also awarded high Russian honours. He died in Dorpat.

== Family ==
His daughter, Johanna Henriette Francisca Bartels (1807–1867), married Friedrich Georg Wilhelm von Struve in 1835, after the death of Struve's first wife. She bore Struve six children, the best known of which was Karl de Struve (1835–1907), who served successively as Russian ambassador to Japan, the United States, and the Netherlands.
