= Lichtenberg's Avertissement =

1777 satirical poster in Göttingen, Germany

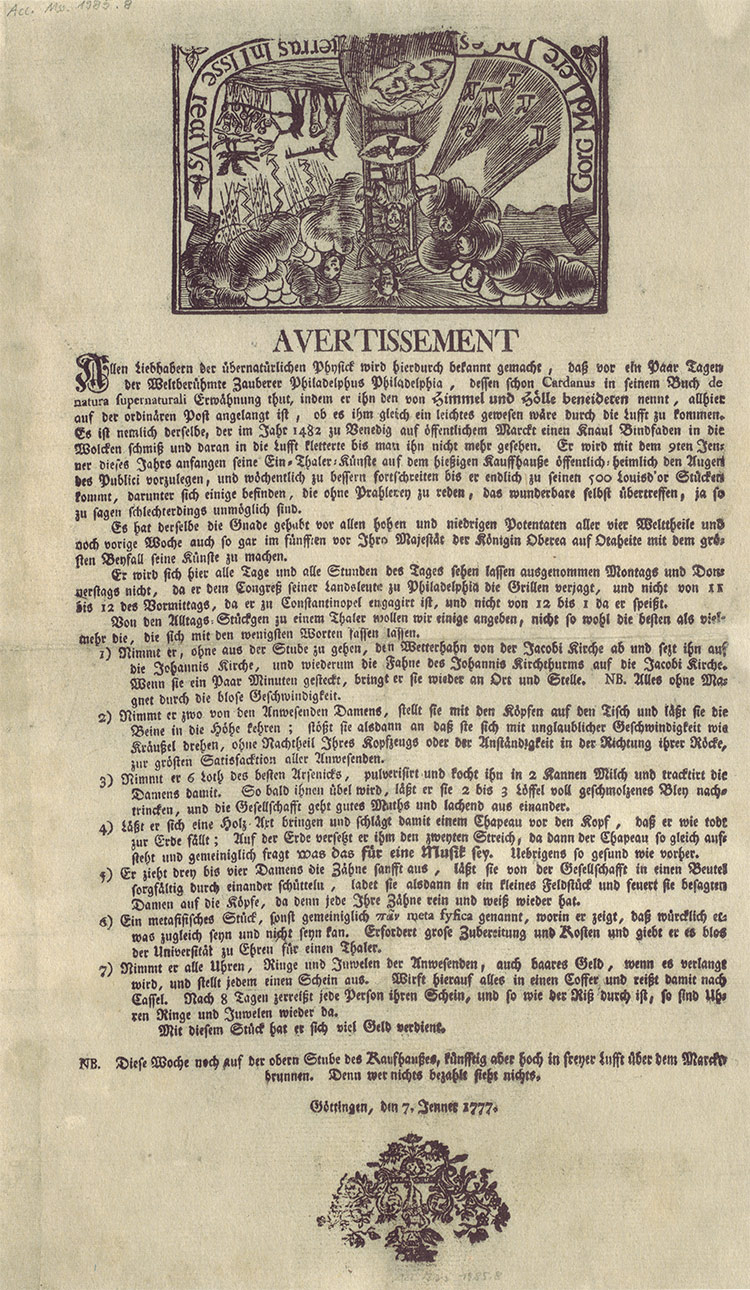
Lichtenberg's Avertissement of January 7, 1777.

Lichtenberg's Avertissement, written by Georg Christoph Lichtenberg, is a poster intended to deter the citizens of Göttingen, Germany, from attending the performance of Jacob Philadelphia in 1777. The performance was supposed to be an exhibition of scientific experiments; however, Lichtenberg considered it to be a magic show. He was angered by the alleged deception and posted the following satire in order to persuade people to avoid the performance. As a result of the extravagant claims that were posted, Philadelphia left Göttingen without giving any exhibitions.

The ad claimed that Philadelphia would poison the women in the audience with arsenic and lead.

== Text ==
The Avertissement reads as follows:

Warning

All fanciers of supernatural physics will, by this poster, be made known that a few days ago, the world-famous magician Philadelphus Philadelphia, who has been mentioned by Cardanus in his book on the nature of the supernatural by calling him the envy of Heaven and Hell, has arrived here on the ordinary mail coach, although it would have been equally easy for him to have come through the air. He is the same person who, in 1482, in an open marketplace in Venice, cast a coil of twine into the air and climbed up until he was no longer seen. Beginning on the ninth of January of this year, he will present, openly and secretly, to the public's eyes, his one-Thaler tricks in the local department store. The tricks will improve every week until he finally arrives at the 500–Louis d'or tricks, among which are those that can be said, without boasting, to surpass the wonderful itself, and be even, so to say, virtually impossible. He had the graciousness to perform these same tricks to great applause before all of the high potentates in all four parts of the world. He even performed in the fifth part of the world a few weeks ago for her majesty Queen Oberea of Tahiti.

He can be seen here every day, at all hours, except not on Mondays and Thursdays, when he expels melancholy thoughts at the venerable Congress of his countrymen in Philadelphia. Also, not from 11 a.m. to 12 noon because he is engaged in Constantinople, and not from 12 noon to 1 p.m., when he lunches.

From the one-Thaler, common, everyday tricks, we want to indicate some, but not the best. Rather, we'll refer to those that can be described in a few words.

1) Without leaving the room, he removes the weather-cock from the St. Jacobi church and sets it on top of the St. Johannis church. Vice versa, he puts the flag from St. Johannis onto St. Jacobi. After they have been there for a few minutes, he brings them back to their proper places. Nota bene: everything is done without magnets, through mere swiftness.

2) He takes two ladies from the audience, positions them with their heads on the table, and lets them turn their legs upward. Then he pushes them so that with unbelievable speed they twist themselves like curls, without damaging their coiffure or the respectability of the arrangement of their clothes, to the great satisfaction of all present.

3) He takes six half-ounces of the best arsenic, grinds it, and cooks it in two cans of milk. He then offers it to the ladies. As soon as they become sick, he gives them two or three spoonfuls of melted lead to drink. The audience then becomes cheerful and breaks out in laughter.

4) He takes an axe and strikes a bonnet with it. The bonnet falls to the ground as though it is dead. On the ground, he gives it a second blow. The bonnet then rises immediately and asks, in a general way: "What music is that?" In other respects, it is in as good condition as before.

5) He gently extracts teeth from three or four ladies, puts the teeth in a bag, and lets the audience carefully shake them. Then he loads them into a small cannon and fires it at the aforementioned ladies. After this, they all have their teeth again, pure and white.

6) A metaphysical trick. He shows that something actually can be and not be at the same time. This requires great preparation and expense, but he performs it for only one Thaler in honor of the University of Göttingen.

7) He takes all of the watches, rings, and jewels, as well as gold cash when it is required, from the audience who is present. He then issues everyone an I.O.U. After this, he throws everything in a suitcase and travels with it to Kassel. Eight days later, each person tears up their I.O.U. After it is torn, the watches, rings, and jewelry reappear. He has earned much money with this trick.

Nota bene: This week, he is still in the upper room of the department store. But, in the future, he will be high in the free air over the fountain in the marketplace. There, whoever pays nothing will see nothing.

Göttingen

January 7, 1777

== Schopenhauer's reference ==
Philosopher Arthur Schopenhauer made reference to the sixth trick in his Critique of the Kantian Philosophy, in connection with Kant's antinomies (Critique of Pure Reason A406). Schopenhauer wrote:

It is strange that no other part of the Kantian philosophy has met with so little opposition, or indeed has received so much recognition as this highly paradoxical doctrine. [...] But the unanimous acclaim that the antinomy has received might ultimately stem from the fact that some people get a sense of inner contentment when they observe [...] something that simultaneously is and is not – a point, accordingly, where they are actually confronted with the sixth stunt of Philadelphia, in Lichtenberg’s broadside.
