= Francesco Hupazoli =

Piedmontese merchant (1587–1702)

Francesco Hupazoli (Casale Monferrato, Kingdom of Sardinia, 15 March 1587 - 27 January 1702) was a self-claimed supercentenarian Piedmontese merchant who settled in Chios. He also acted as Consul of the Venetian Republic in Smyrna. He is particularly known for having led a peculiar lifestyle with a strict diet that allegedly made him live 115 years, over three centuries. He married 5 times, and had 24 legitimate and 25 illegitimate children. From his fifth marriage, which took place at the age of 99, he had 4 children. He left in manuscript a complete diary of the main events of his life.

== Recensions ==
The details that are known of his life come from his own writings and from the various recensions derived from them. One of the most complete descriptions is given by the German philosopher and physicist Georg Christoph Lichtenberg, based on an article published in 1787 in the Hannöverches Magazín. In his collection of reflections Sudelbücher (usually translated as Waste Books), in note 928 of Notebook J (1789–1793), entitled Let whoever imitate him, he writes:

Hupazoli lived in three centuries. He was born in Casale on 15 March 1587 and died on 27 January 1702. He married five women with whom he had twenty-five children, and in addition to this number he also left twenty -five bastards. He never drank anything but water, he never smoked, he ate little but well, especially game and fruit, and since he thought that this provided him with enough moisture, he often spent months and months drinking only the juice of black salsify (Scorzonera Limm.). He never attended to banquets in order to always have dinner early and be able to go to bed half an hour afterwards. He left us twenty-two volumes in which he wrote everything he had done. He never had a bloodletting or needed any medication other than his diet. At one hundred years his grey hair turned black. At one hundred and nine, he lost his teeth but four years later two more grew out; and so on. (Vid. Hannöverches Magazin, 1787, no. 38 of the Berlinisches Intelligentzblatt.)

In the New American Cyclopædia (1858) some more information is given, taken in part from Hupazoli's writings: His parents sent him to Rome to be educated, and obliged him to enter holy orders. He travelled in Greece and the Levant. At Chios, he was married in 1625, and engaged in commerce. At 82 years of age, he was appointed consul of Venice at Smyrna. He was of a mild temper and exact in his religious observances, attended mass every morning, then walked for several hours, after which he applied himself to his correspondence, and gave the rest of his time to society. He was sick for the first time in 1701, when he had a fever which lasted 15 days, and he remained deaf for 8 months after his recovery. At the age of 100 years his hair, beard, and eyebrows, which were white, became again black. At the age of 112 years, he had two new teeth but lost all of them before his death, and lived on soup. He suffered in the last year of his life from kidney stones, and died of a cold.
