= Heinrich Wilhelm Brandes =

German meteorologist and physicist

- Born: 27 July 1777; Groden near Ritzebüttel
- Died: 17 May 1834 (aged 56); Leipzig
- Occupations: German meteorologist and physicist

Heinrich Wilhelm Brandes (German: [ˈbʀandəs]; 27 July 1777 – 17 May 1834) was a German physicist, meteorologist, and astronomer.

Brandes was born in 1777 in Groden near Ritzebüttel (a former exclave of the Free Imperial City of Hamburg, today in Cuxhaven), the third son of Albert Georg Brandes, a preacher. He studied at the University of Göttingen (then in the Electorate of Hanover) from 1796 to 1798 under Abraham Gotthelf Kästner and Georg Christoph Lichtenberg. Carl Friedrich Gauss was a fellow student. He attained his doctorate in 1800, and spent a short time teaching privately. As an astronomer, he was noted for demonstrating that meteors occur in the upper atmosphere and thus not really a meteorological phenomenon.

From 1801 to 1811 he was at first a technical designer of dykes on the Weser river at Eckwarden, Butjadingen, in the Duchy of Oldenburg, and later a dyke inspector for the lower right bank of the Weser.

In 1811 he became a professor of mathematics at the newly created University of Breslau, a merger of two Wrocław colleges. In 1826 he gained the chair of physics at the University of Leipzig.

He had a very wide range of activities. He wrote a considerable number of mathematics textbooks. In 1820 he published the first weather charts in Beiträgen zur Witterungskunde ("Contributions to Meteorology"). Thus he is considered to be a founder of synoptic meteorology. In 1824 he developed a new method to compute the Euler constant numerically. He died on 17 May 1834 in Leipzig and was buried in the Alter Johannisfriedhof.

== Publications ==
- Versuche, die Entfernung, die Geschwindigkeit und die Bahnen der Sternschnuppen zu bestimmen ("Attempts to determine the distance, speed and course of meteors") (with Johann Friedrich Benzenberg; 1800)
- Die vornehmsten Lehren der Astronomie in Briefen an eine Freundin dargestellt ("Major theories of astronomy, described in letters to a friend") (4 vols, 1811–16)
- Untersuchungen über den mittleren Gang der Wärmeänderungen durchs ganze Jahr; über gleichzeitige Witterungs – Ereignisse in weit voneinander entfernten Weltgegenden; über die Formen der Wolken, die Entstehung des Regens und der Stürme; und über andere Gegenstände der Witterungskunde ("Meteorology") (Leipzig: Barth, 1820)
