= Lobachevsky integral formula =

Mathematical identity used to evaluate certain improper integrals

In mathematics, Dirichlet integrals play an important role in distribution theory. We can see the Dirichlet integral in terms of distributions.

One of those is the improper integral of the sinc function over the positive real line,

$$\int_0^\infty \frac {\sin x} x \, dx =\int_0^\infty \frac {\sin^2 x}{x^2} \, dx = \frac \pi 2.$$

== Lobachevsky's Dirichlet integral formula ==
Let $f(x)$ be a continuous function satisfying the $\pi$-periodic assumption $f(x+\pi)=f(x)$, and $f(\pi-x)=f(x)$, for $0\leq x<\infty$. If the integral $\int_0^\infty \frac{\sin x} x f(x) \, dx$ is taken to be an improper Riemann integral, we have Lobachevsky's Dirichlet integral formula

$$\int_0^\infty \frac{\sin^2 x}{x^2} f(x) \, dx = \int_0^\infty\frac{\sin x} x f(x) \, dx = \int_0^{\pi/2} f(x) \, dx$$

Moreover, we have the following identity as an extension of the Lobachevsky Dirichlet integral formula

$$\int_0^\infty \frac{\sin^4x}{x^4} f(x) \, dx = \int_0^{\pi/2} f(t) \, dt-\frac 2 3 \int_0^{\pi/2} \sin^2tf(t) \, dt.$$

As an application, take $f(x)=1$. Then

$$\int_0^\infty \frac{\sin^4x}{x^4} \, dx = \frac \pi 3 .$$
