= Adolph Göpel =

German mathematician (1812–1847)

- Born: 29 September 1812; Rostock, Germany
- Died: 7 June 1847 (aged 34); Berlin, Germany
- Education: University of Berlin
- Scientific career
- Doctoral advisor: Enno Dirksen

Adolph Göpel (29 September 1812 – 7 June 1847) was a German mathematician who wrote the first paper on hyperelliptic functions and who introduced Göpel tetrads.

== Life and work ==
His uncle was a diplomat so he attended his first mathematical lectures in Italy when he was 13. He entered the Friedrich Wilhelm University in 1829 and received his doctorate in 1835. He did not correspond with many mathematicians, excepting August Leopold Crelle. After his death some of his works were published in Crelle's Journal.
