= Nikolai Lobachevsky =

Russian mathematician (1792–1856)

- Николай Лобачевский
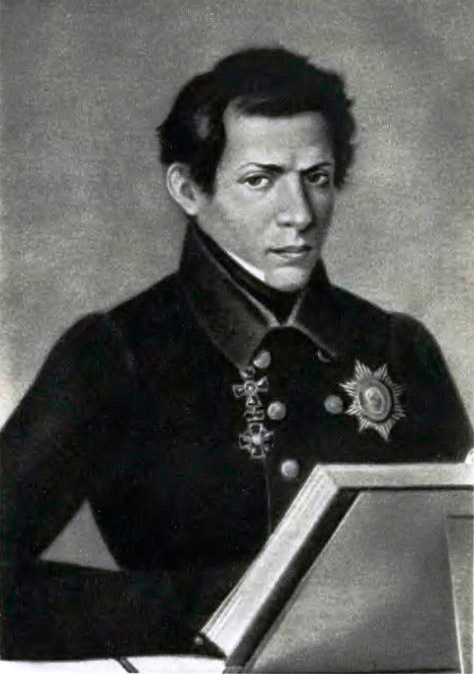
- Portrait by Lev Kryukov, c. 1839
- Born: 1 December 1792 (Note: This is the date given by Kagan (1957) and Andronov (1956) (the latter gives 1 December [O.S. 20 November] 1792).) (Note: Older sources in Russian—e.g., Popov (1857)—give 1793 rather than 1792, while the Dictionary of Scientific Biography (1970) gives December 2, 1792. Further information on Lobachevsky's birthdate can be found in Papadopoulos (2010) However, note that page 207 incorrectly converts 1792-11-20 to 1792-12-02 instead of 1792-12-01); Makaryev, (Note: spelled Makaryev, not Makaryevo, at that time; nominative form in Russian: Макарьев.) Makaryevsky Uyezd, Nizhny Novgorod Governorate, (Note: Not to be confused with Makaryev in Makaryevsky uezd, Kostroma Governorate) (Note: Other sources in Russian—e.g., A. A. Andronov (1956)—give the city of Nizhny Novgorod rather than the Governorate as his birthplace) Russian Empire
- Died: 24 February 1856 (aged 63); Kazan, Kazan Governorate, Russian Empire
- Education: Kazan University (MSc, 1811)
- Known for: Lobachevskian geometry
- Scientific career
- Fields: Geometry
- Academic advisors: J. C. M. Bartels
- Notable students: Nikolai Brashman

Signature
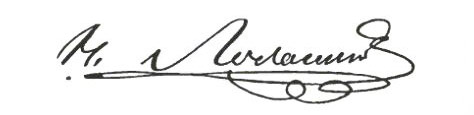

Nikolai Ivanovich Lobachevsky (/loʊbəˈtʃɛfski/; Russian: Никола́й Ива́нович Лобаче́вский, IPA: [nʲɪkɐˈlaj ɪˈvanəvʲɪtɕ ləbɐˈtɕefskʲɪj]; 1 December [O.S. 20 November] 1792 – 24 February [O.S. 12 February] 1856) was a Russian mathematician and geometer, known primarily for his work on hyperbolic geometry, otherwise known as Lobachevskian geometry, and also for his fundamental study on Dirichlet integrals, known as the Lobachevsky integral formula.

William Kingdon Clifford called Lobachevsky the "Copernicus of Geometry" due to the revolutionary character of his work. (Note: Bell (1986) attributes this quote to another mathematician, William Kingdon Clifford.) (Note: This is a quote from G. B. Halsted's translator's preface to his 1914 translation of The Theory of Parallels: "What Vesalius was to Galen, what Copernicus was to Ptolemy that was Lobachevsky to Euclid." — W. K. Clifford)

== Biography ==
Nikolai Lobachevsky was born either in or near the city of Nizhny Novgorod in the Russian Empire (now in Nizhny Novgorod Oblast, Russia) in 1792 to parents of Russian and Polish origin – Ivan Maksimovich Lobachevsky and Praskovia Alexandrovna Lobachevskaya. (Note: Ivan Maksimovich Lobachevsky (Jan Łobaczewski in Polish) came from a Polish noble family of the Jastrzębiec and Łada coats-of-arms, and was classified as a Pole in Russian official documents) He was one of three children. When he was seven, his father, a clerk in a land-surveying office, died, and Nikolai moved with his mother to Kazan. Nikolai Lobachevsky attended Kazan Gymnasium from 1802, graduating in 1807, and then received a scholarship to Kazan University, which had been founded just three years earlier in 1804.

At Kazan University, Lobachevsky was influenced by professor Johann Christian Martin Bartels, a former teacher and friend of the German mathematician Carl Friedrich Gauss (1777–1855). Lobachevsky received a Master of Science in physics and mathematics in 1811. In 1814, he became a lecturer at Kazan University, and in 1816, he was promoted to associate professor. In 1822, at the age of 30, he became a full professor, teaching mathematics, physics, and astronomy. He served in many administrative positions and became the rector of Kazan University in 1827. In 1832, he married Varvara Alexeyevna Moiseyeva. They had a large number of children (eighteen according to his son's memoirs, though only seven apparently survived into adulthood). He was dismissed from the university in 1846, ostensibly due to his deteriorating health: by the early 1850s, he was nearly blind and unable to walk. He died in poverty in 1856 and was buried in Arskoe Cemetery, Kazan.

In 1811, in his student days, Lobachevsky was accused by a vengeful supervisor of atheism (Russian: признаки безбожия, lit. 'signs of godlessness').

== Career ==
Lobachevsky's main achievement is the development (independently from János Bolyai) of a non-Euclidean geometry, also referred to as Lobachevskian geometry. Before him, mathematicians were trying to deduce Euclid's fifth postulate from other axioms. Euclid's fifth is a rule in Euclidean geometry which states (in John Playfair's reformulation) that for any given line and point not on the line, there is only one line through the point not intersecting the given line. Lobachevsky would instead develop a geometry in which the fifth postulate was not true. This idea was first reported on 23 February [O.S. 11 February] 1826 to the session of the department of physics and mathematics, and this research was printed in the periodical 'Kazan University Course Notes' as On the Origin of Geometry (О началах геометрии) between 1829 and 1830. In 1829, Lobachevsky wrote a paper about his ideas called "A Concise Outline of the Foundations of Geometry" that was published by the Kazan Messenger but was rejected when it was submitted to the St. Petersburg Academy of Sciences for publication.

The non-Euclidean geometry that Lobachevsky developed is referred to as hyperbolic geometry. Lobachevsky replaced Playfair's axiom with the statement that for any given point there exists more than one line that can be extended through that point and run parallel to another line of which that point is not part. He developed the angle of parallelism which depends on the distance the point is off the given line. In hyperbolic geometry the sum of angles in a hyperbolic triangle must be less than 180 degrees. Non-Euclidean geometry stimulated the development of differential geometry which has many applications. Hyperbolic geometry is frequently referred to as "Lobachevskian geometry" or "Bolyai–Lobachevskian geometry".

Some mathematicians and historians have wrongly claimed that Lobachevsky in his studies in non-Euclidean geometry was influenced by Gauss, which is untrue. Gauss himself appreciated Lobachevsky's published works highly, but they never had personal correspondence between them prior to the publication. Although three people—Gauss, Lobachevsky and Bolyai—can be credited with discovery of hyperbolic geometry, Gauss never published his ideas, and Lobachevsky was the first to present his views to the world mathematical community.

Lobachevsky's magnum opus Geometriya was completed in 1823, but was not published in its exact original form until 1909, long after he had died. Lobachevsky was also the author of New Foundations of Geometry (1835–1838). He also wrote Geometrical Investigations on the Theory of Parallels (1840) and Pangeometry (1855). (Note: Lobachevsky dictated two versions of that work, a first one in Russian, and a second one in French.)

Another of Lobachevsky's achievements was developing a method for the approximation of the roots of algebraic equations. This method is now known as the Dandelin–Gräffe method, named after two other mathematicians who discovered it independently. In Russia, it is called the Lobachevsky method. Lobachevsky gave the definition of a function as a correspondence between two sets of real numbers (Peter Gustav Lejeune Dirichlet gave the same definition independently soon after Lobachevsky).

== Impact ==
E. T. Bell wrote about Lobachevsky's influence on the following development of mathematics in his 1937 book Men of Mathematics:

The boldness of his challenge and its successful outcome have inspired mathematicians and scientists in general to challenge other "axioms" or accepted "truths", for example the "law" of causality which, for centuries, have seemed as necessary to straight thinking as Euclid's postulate appeared until Lobachevsky discarded it. The full impact of the Lobachevskian method of challenging axioms has probably yet to be felt. It is no exaggeration to call Lobachevsky the Copernicus of Geometry, for geometry is only a part of the vaster domain which he renovated; it might even be just to designate him as a Copernicus of all thought.

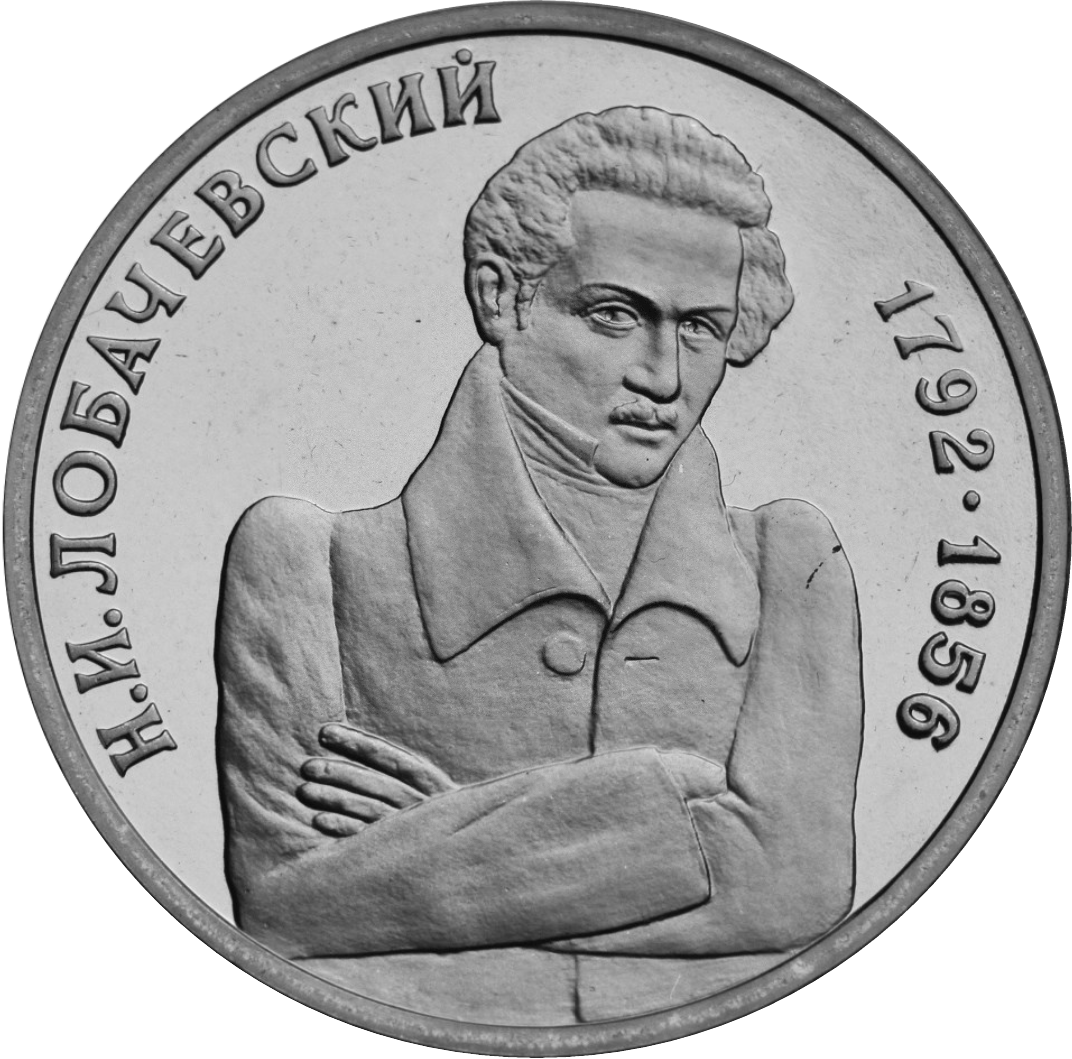
Russian 1 rouble coin commemorating the 200th anniversary of Lobachevsky's birth, 1992.

== Honors ==
- 1858 Lobachevskij, an asteroid discovered in 1972, was named in his honour.
- The lunar crater Lobachevsky was named in his honor.
- Lobachevsky Prize, a mathematics award by the Kazan State University.
- The Lobachevsky University was named in his honor.
- A street in Ploiesti, Romania was named in his honor.

== In popular culture ==
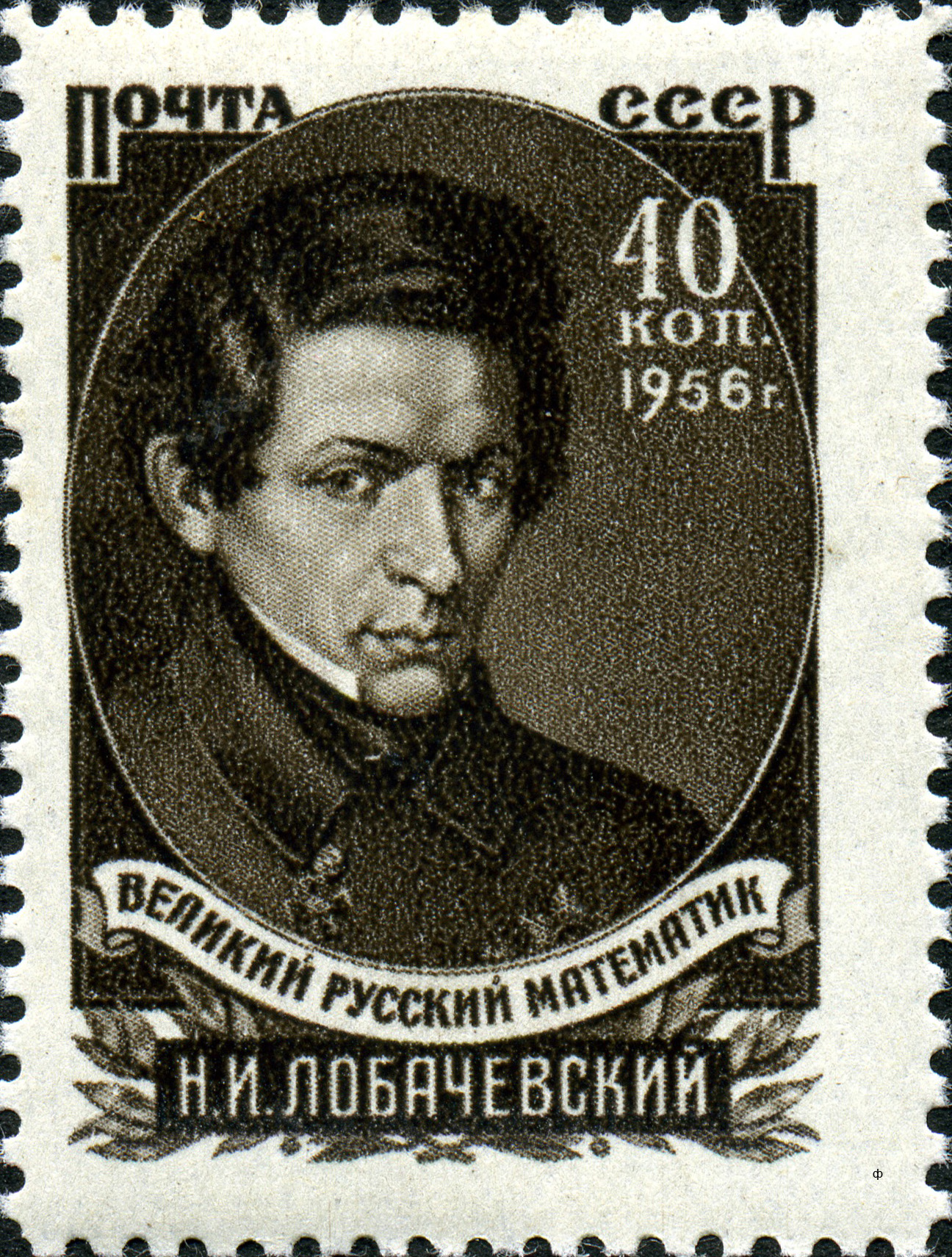
Stamp of 1956 marking the centenary of Lobachevsky's death

Lobachevsky is the subject of songwriter/mathematician Tom Lehrer's humorous song "Lobachevsky" from his 1953 Songs by Tom Lehrer album. In the song, Lehrer portrays a Russian mathematician who sings about how Lobachevsky influenced him: "And who made me a big success / and brought me wealth and fame? / Nikolai Ivanovich Lobachevsky is his name." Lobachevsky's secret to mathematical success is given as "Plagiarize!", as long as one is always careful to "call it, please, research". According to Lehrer, the song is "not intended as a slur on [Lobachevsky's] character" and the name was chosen "solely for prosodic reasons". The song was based on Danny Kaye and Sylvia Fine's monologue on Stanislavsky and the secret of success in the acting profession.

In Poul Anderson's 1969 fantasy novella "Operation Changeling" – which was later expanded into the novel Operation Chaos (1971) – a group of sorcerers navigate a non-Euclidean universe with the assistance of the ghosts of Lobachevsky and Bolyai.

Roger Zelazny's science fiction novel Doorways in the Sand contains a poem dedicated to Lobachevsky.

In the sitcom 3rd Rock from the Sun, "Dick and the Single Girl" (season 2 episode 24) originally aired on May 11 1997, Sonja Umdahl (Christine Baranski), a forgotten colleague who is transferring to teach at another university, gives as the reason behind her departure that Columbia is the only holder of Nikolai Lobachevsky's manuscripts.

== Works ==
- Kagan V. F. (ed.): N. I. Lobachevsky – Complete Collected Works, Vol. I–IV (Russian), Moscow–Leningrad (GITTL), (1946–51).
  - Vol. I: Geometrical Researches on the Theory of Parallels (1840); On the Origin of Geometry (1829–30).
  - Vol. II: New Principles of Geometry with Complete Theory of Parallels (1835–38).
  - Vol. III: Imaginary Geometry (1835); Application of imaginary geometry to certain integrals (1836); Pangeometry (1856).
  - Vol. IV: Works on Other Subjects.

English translations

- Geometrical Researches on the Theory of Parallels. G. B. Halsted (tr.). 1891. Reprinted in Roberto Bonola: Non-Euclidean Geometry: A Critical and Historical Study of its Development. 1912. Dover reprint 1955.

Also in: Seth Braver Lobachevski illuminated, MAA 2011.

- Pangeometry. Excerpts translated by Henry P. Manning: in D. E. Smith A Source Book in Mathematics. McGraw Hill 1929. Dover reprint, pp. 360–374.
- New Principles of Geometry with Complete Theory of Parallels . G. B. Halsted (tr.). 1897.
- Nikolai I. Lobachevsky, Pangeometry, translator and editor: A. Papadopoulos, Heritage of European Mathematics Series, Vol. 4, European Mathematical Society. 2010, 310 p.

== See also ==
- 1858 Lobachevskij
- Gauss–Bolyai–Lobachevsky space
- Hyperbolic geometry
- Hyperboloid structure
- Non-Euclidean geometry
- Lobachevsky (crater)
- Lobachevsky function
- Lobachevsky Medal
- Lobachevsky University
- Poincaré half-plane model
