= Abraham Gotthelf Kästner =

German mathematician (1719–1800)

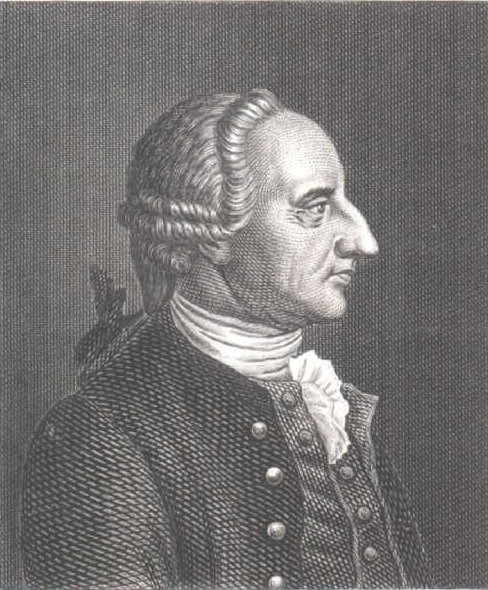
- Born: 27 September 1719; Leipzig, Electorate of Saxony
- Died: 20 June 1800 (aged 80); Göttingen, Duchy of Brunswick-Lüneburg
- Education: University of Leipzig (Dr. phil. hab., 1739)
- Scientific career
- Fields: Mathematics
- Workplaces: University of Leipzig; University of Göttingen
- Thesis: Theoria radicum in aequationibus (1739)
- Doctoral advisor: Christian August Hausen
- Doctoral students: Heinrich Wilhelm Brandes; Johann Christian Polycarp Erxleben; Georg Christoph Lichtenberg; Johann Tobias Mayer; Johann Friedrich Pfaff
- Other notable students: Johann Christian Martin Bartels; Farkas Bolyai

Abraham Gotthelf Kästner (27 September 1719 – 20 June 1800) was a German mathematician and epigrammatist.

He was known in his professional life for writing textbooks and compiling encyclopedias rather than for original research. Georg Christoph Lichtenberg was one of his doctoral students, and admired the man greatly. He became best-known for his epigrammatic poems. The crater Kästner on the Moon is named after him.

== Life ==
Kästner was the son of law professor Abraham Kästner. He married Anna Rosina Baumann in 1757 after a 12-year engagement. She died on 4 March 1758, less than a year later, of lung disease. Later Kästner had a daughter Catharine with his cleaning lady.

Kästner studied law, philosophy, physics, mathematics and metaphysics in Leipzig from 1731, and was appointed a Notary in 1733. He gained his habilitation from the University of Leipzig in 1739, and lectured there in mathematics, philosophy, logic and law, becoming an associate professor in 1746. In 1751 he was elected a member of the Royal Swedish Academy of Sciences. In 1756 he took up a position as a full professor of natural philosophy and geometry at the University of Göttingen. In 1763, succeeding Tobias Mayer, he became director of the observatory as well. One of his doctoral students was the physicist and aphorist Georg Christoph Lichtenberg, who became a colleague of his at Göttingen. Other notable doctoral students were Johann Christian Polycarp Erxleben, Johann Pfaff (doctoral advisor of Carl Friedrich Gauss), Johann Tobias Mayer, Heinrich Wilhelm Brandes, Farkas Bolyai (father of János Bolyai), and Georg Klügel. Kästner died in 1800 in Göttingen.

== Work ==
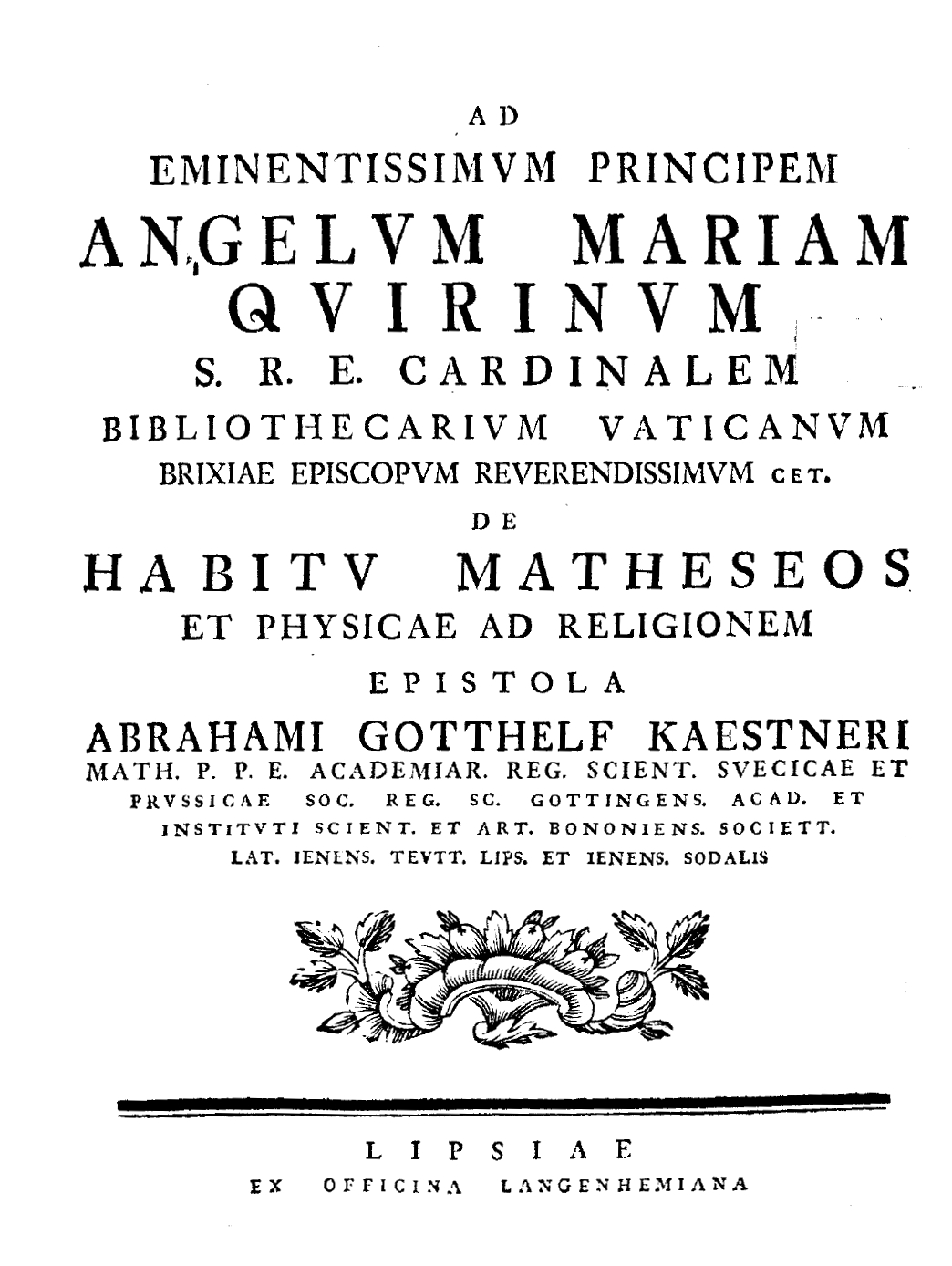
De habitu matheseos et physicae ad religionem, 1752

Kästner became most well known for his poems, which appeared first in print without his consent in 1781 and were notable for their biting humour and sharp irony on different contemporary personalities. They were published in Vermischten Schriften 1 und 2 (Altenburg 1783, 2 volumes), and further poems were published in Gesammelten poetischen und prosaischen schönwissenschaftlichen Werken (Berlin 1841, 4 volumes) and later in Joseph Kürschner's Deutscher Nationalliteratur, volume 73 (hrsg. von Minor; Stuttgart 1883).

His numerous mathematical writings include Anfangsgründe der Mathematik ("Foundations of Mathematics") (Göttingen 1758-69, 4 volumes; 6th edition 1800) and Geschichte der Mathematik ("History of Mathematics") (Göttingen 1796-1800, 4 volumes). Geschichte der Mathematik is considered an astute work, but lacks a comprehensive overview of all subsections of mathematics.

He also translated many of the Proceedings of the Royal Swedish Academy of Sciences into German, including all volumes of the Proceedings (Handlingar) between 1749 and 1781 and some of New Proceedings (Nya handlingar) from 1784 to 1792.

He was elected a Fellow of the Royal Society in April 1789.

== Legacy ==
[Abraham Gotthelf Kästner is] the best mathematician among poets and the best poet among mathematicians.

— Carl Friedrich Gauss, quoted in Morris Kline, Mathematics and the Physical World (1959) Ch. 26: Non-Euclidean Geometries, p. 444. Gauss meant it as a sarcastic remark, after he presented his construction of the 17-gon, and Kästner failed to notice its significance.

== Publications ==
- De habitu matheseos et physicae ad religionem (in Latin). Leipzig: Johann Christian Langenheim. 1752.
