= Georg Christoph Lichtenberg =

German scientist and satirist (1742–1799)

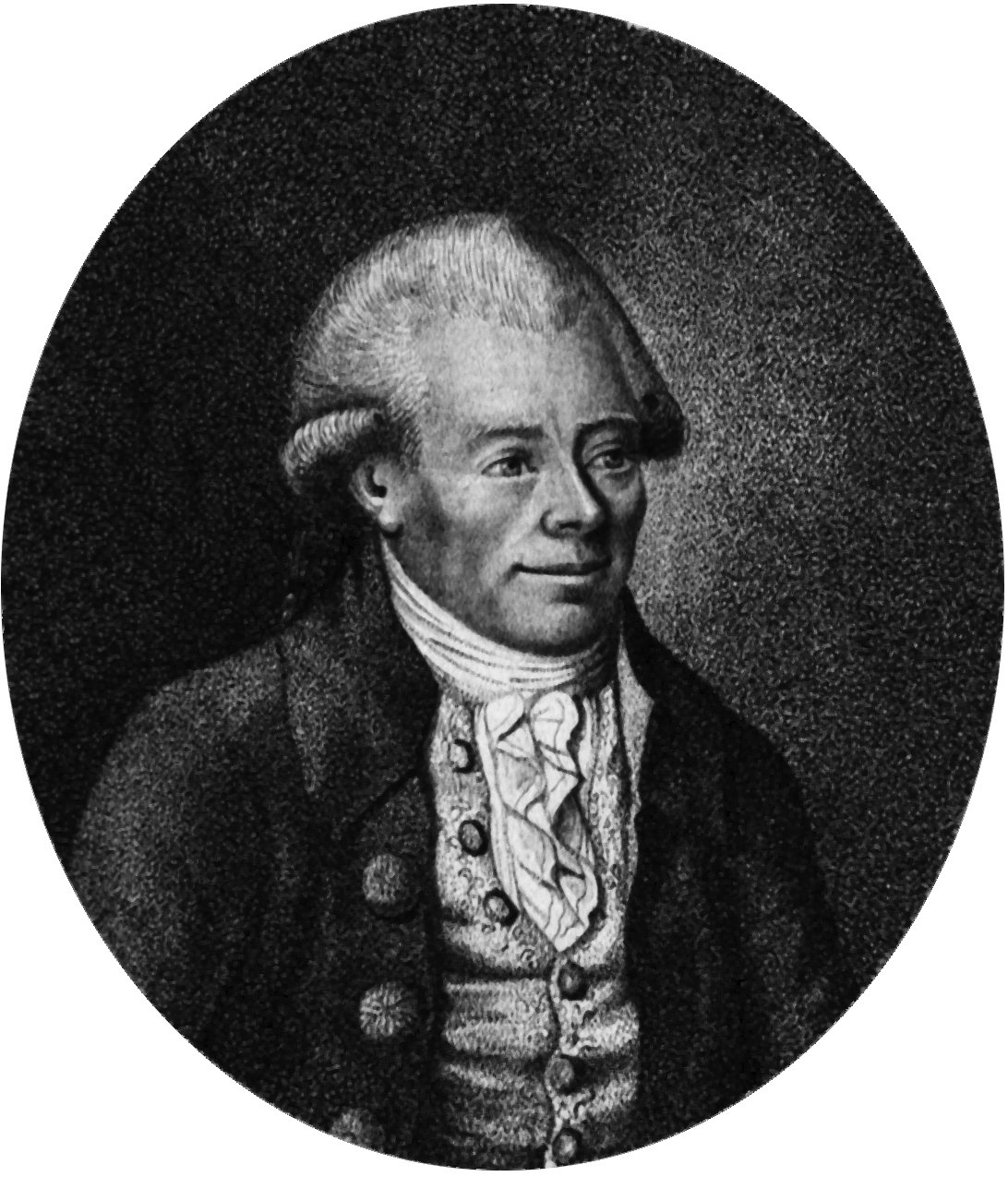
- Born: 1 July 1742; Ober-Ramstadt, Landgraviate of Hesse-Darmstadt, Holy Roman Empire
- Died: 24 February 1799 (aged 56); Göttingen, Electorate of Hanover, Holy Roman Empire
- Education: University of Göttingen (1763–67)
- Known for: Lichtenberg figures
- Scientific career
- Fields: Scientist, satirist, aphorist
- Workplaces: University of Göttingen
- Doctoral advisor: Abraham Gotthelf Kästner
- Doctoral students: Heinrich Wilhelm Brandes; Ernst Chladni; Johann Tobias Mayer
- Other notable students: Alexander von Humboldt; Carl Friedrich Kielmeyer

Georg Christoph Lichtenberg (German: [ˈlɪçtn̩bɛʁk]; 1 July 1742 – 24 February 1799) was a German physicist, satirist, and Anglophile. He was the first person in Germany to hold a professorship explicitly dedicated to experimental physics. He is remembered for his posthumously published notebooks, which he himself called Sudelbücher, a description modelled on the English bookkeeping term "waste books" or "scrapbooks", and for his discovery of the tree-like electrical discharge patterns now called Lichtenberg figures.

== Life ==
Georg Christoph Lichtenberg was born in Ober-Ramstadt near Darmstadt, Landgraviate of Hesse-Darmstadt, the youngest of 17 children. His father, Johann Conrad Lichtenberg, was a pastor ascending through the ranks of the church hierarchy, who eventually became superintendent for Darmstadt. The mother of Georg Christoph Lichtenberg was Katharina Henriette Lichtenberg, nee Eckard, daughter of pastor Johann Peter Eckard. His maternal aunt Sophie Elisabeth Eckard was married to composer and harpsichordist Christoph Graupner. Unusually for a clergyman in those times, he seems to have possessed a fair amount of scientific knowledge. Lichtenberg was educated at his parents' house until the age of 10, when he joined the Lateinschule in Darmstadt. His intelligence became obvious at a very early age. He wanted to study mathematics, but his family could not afford to pay for lessons. In 1762, his mother applied to Ludwig VIII, Landgrave of Hesse-Darmstadt, who granted sufficient funds. In 1763, Lichtenberg entered the University of Göttingen.

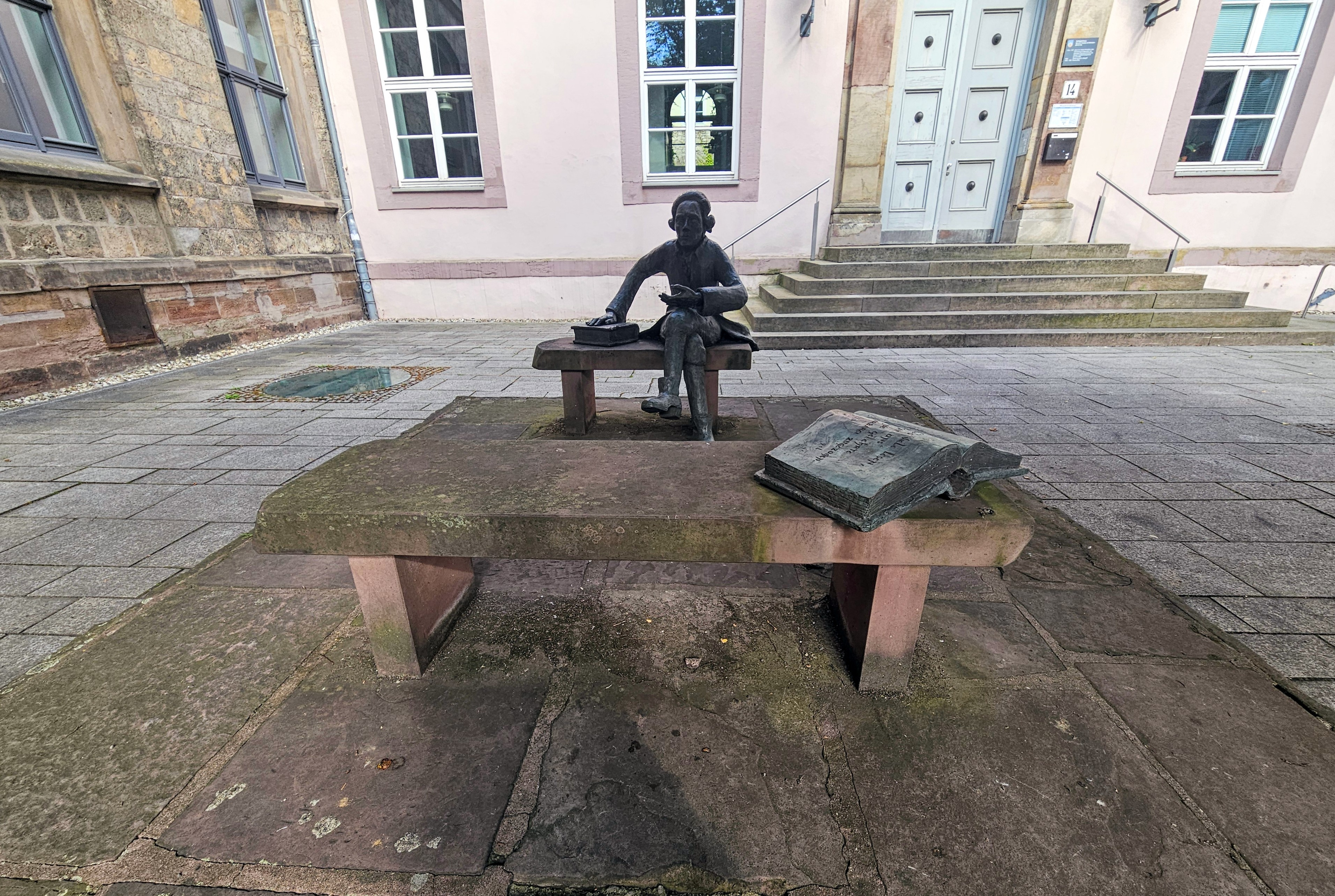
Statue of Lichtenberg at the University of Göttingen

In 1769, he became extraordinary professor of physics, and six years later ordinary professor. He held this post till his death. Invited by his students, he visited England twice, from Easter to early Summer 1770 and from August 1774 to Christmas 1775, where he was received cordially by George III and Queen Charlotte. He led the King through the royal observatory in Richmond, upon which the king proposed that he become professor of philosophy. He also met with participants of Cook's voyages. Great Britain impressed him, and he subsequently became a well-known Anglophile.

One of the first scientists to introduce experiments with apparatus in their lectures, Lichtenberg was a popular and respected figure in contemporary European intellectual circles. He was one of the first to introduce Benjamin Franklin's lightning rod to Germany by installing such devices in his house and garden sheds. He maintained relations with most of the great figures of that era, including Goethe and Kant. In 1784, Alessandro Volta visited Göttingen especially to see him and his experiments. Mathematician Karl Friedrich Gauss sat in on his lectures.

Alexander von Humboldt was a student of Lichtenberg in Göttingen.

In 1793, he was elected a member of the Royal Society.

Lichtenberg was prone to procrastination. He failed to launch the first hydrogen balloon. He always dreamed of writing a novel à la Fielding's Tom Jones, but never finished more than a few pages.

Philosophically Lichtenberg was most influenced by Baruch Spinoza and Immanuel Kant, the latter of which he exchanged letters with.

Lichtenberg became a hunchback as a child owing to a malformation of his spine suffered from a fall. This left him unusually short, even by 18th-century standards. Over time, this malformation grew worse, ultimately affecting his breathing.

=== Personal life ===
In 1777, he met Maria Stechard, then aged 13, who lived with the professor permanently after 1780. She died in 1782. Their relationship was made into a novel by Gert Hofmann, which was translated by his son Michael Hofmann into English with the title Lichtenberg and the Little Flower Girl.

In 1783, the year after Stechard's death, Lichtenberg met Margarethe Kellner (1768–1848). He married her in 1789, to give her a pension, as he thought he was to die soon. They had six children: Georg Christoph Lichtenberg (1786–1845), Louise Wilhelmina Lichtenberg (1789–1802), Agnes Lichtenberg (1793–1820), Augusta Friederike Lichtenberg (1795–1837), Heinrich August Lichtenberg (1797–1836) and Christian Wilhelm Lichtenberg (1799–1860). Margarethe outlived Lichtenberg by 49 years.

In 1799, Lichtenberg died in Göttingen after a short illness at the age of 56.

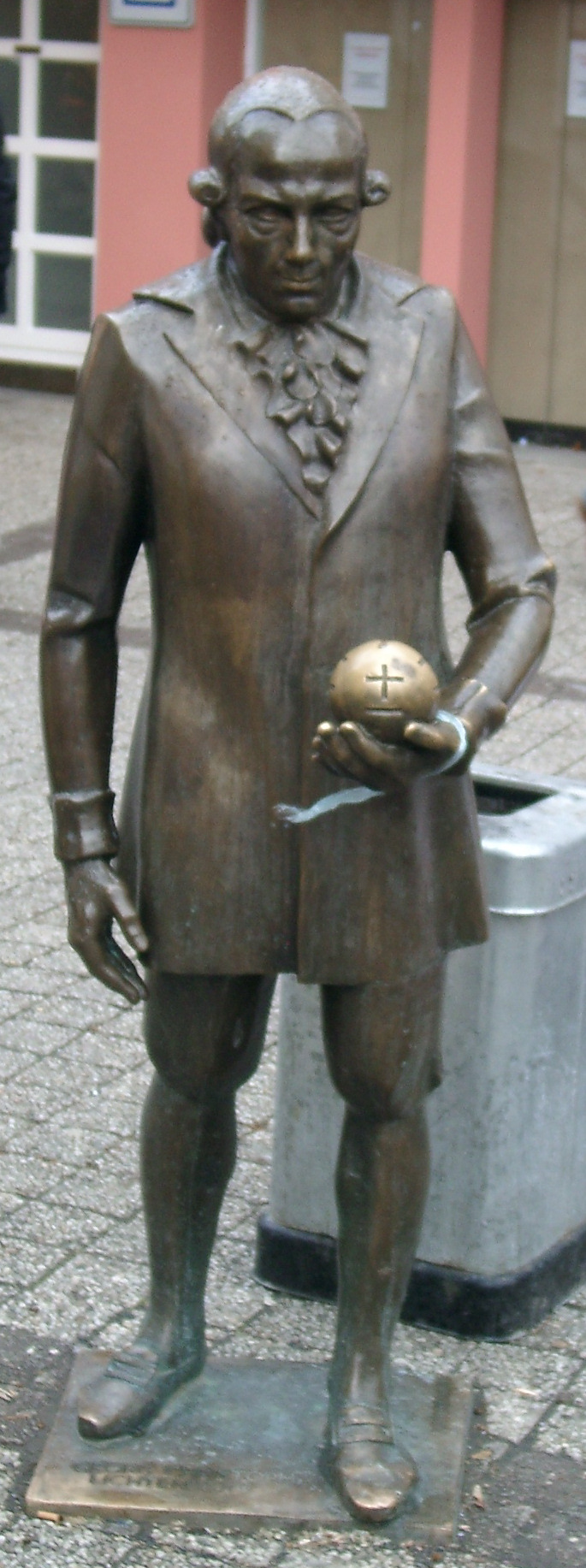
Lichtenberg's monument at the Göttingen market

=== Brothers and sisters ===
Lichtenberg had 17 brothers and sisters, most of whom died in infancy; among those who survived past infancy are:

- Klara Sophie Lichtenberg (1718–1780).
- Gottlieb Christoph Lichtenberg (1724–1756) – Office Secretary in Grünstadt and Bailiff in Seeheim, was married Sophie Dorothea Wißmann (1722–1792), widow of bailiff Georg Alexander Campen (1704–1752), his son was Head of Government in Grand Duchy of Hesse Friedrich August von Lichtenberg (1755–1819), among his grandchildren was Administrative Officer in Grand Duchy of Hesse Ludwig von Lichtenberg (1784–1845).
- Christian Friedrich Lichtenberg (1734–1790) – Oberappellationsrat and Secret Tribunal Council, unmarried.
- Ludwig Christian Lichtenberg (1737–1812) – Geheimer Archivarius in Gotha and Geheimer Assistenzrat, unmarried.

== Scrap books ==
The "scrapbooks" (Sudelbücher in German) are notebooks, in the tradition of commonplace books or waste books, which Lichtenberg kept from his student days until the end of his life. Each volume was accorded a letter of the alphabet from A, which began in 1765, to L, which broke off at Lichtenberg's death in 1799.

These notebooks first became known to the world after the man's death, when the first and second editions of Lichtenbergs Vermischte Schriften (1800–06 and 1844–53) were published by his sons and brothers. After the initial publications, however, notebooks G and H, and most of notebook K, were destroyed or disappeared. Those missing parts are believed to have contained sensitive materials. The manuscripts of the remaining notebooks are preserved in Göttingen University.

The notebooks contain quotations of passages that struck Lichtenberg (like his recension of the supercentenarian Francesco Hupazoli's life), titles of books to read, autobiographical sketches, and short or long reflections, including keen observations on human nature, in the manner of the 17th-century French moralists. Those reflections helped him earn his posthumous fame as one of the best aphorists in Western intellectual history. Some scholars have attempted to distill a system of thought of Lichtenberg's scattered musings, but he was not a professional philosopher, and had no need to present, or to conceive, a consistent philosophy.

The scrapbooks reveal a critical and analytical way of thinking and emphasis on experimental evidence in physics, through which he became one of the early founders and advocates of modern scientific methodology.

The more experience and experiments are accumulated during the exploration of nature, the more faltering its theories become. It is always good though not to abandon them instantly. For every hypothesis which used to be good at least serves the purpose of duly summarizing and keeping all phenomena until its own time. One should lay down the conflicting experience separately, until it has accumulated sufficiently to justify the efforts necessary to edifice a new theory. (Lichtenberg: scrapbook JII/1602)

Lichtenberg, an atheist, satirized religion saying "I thank the Lord a thousand times for having made me become an atheist."

== Other works ==
As a satirist, Lichtenberg takes high rank among the German writers of the 18th century. His biting wit involved him in many controversies with well-known contemporaries, such as the Swiss physiognomist Johann Kaspar Lavater whose science of physiognomy he ridiculed, and Johann Heinrich Voss, whose views on Greek pronunciation called forth a powerful satire, Über die Pronunciation der Schöpse des alten Griechenlandes. For Laurence Sterne's wit on the bigotry of the clergy, in his novel Tristram Shandy, Lichtenberg condemned him as a scandalum ecclesiae (a scandal for the Church).

In 1777, Lichtenberg opposed the apparent misrepresentation of science by Jacob Philadelphia. Lichtenberg considered him to be a magician, not a physicist, and created a satirical poster that was intended to prevent Philadelphia from performing his exhibition in Göttingen. The placard, called “Lichtenberg's Avertissement,” described extravagant and miraculous tricks that were to be performed. As a result, Philadelphia left the city without a performance.

Based on his visits to England, his Briefe aus England, which include vivid descriptions of David Garrick's acting, are considered the most engaging of his works published during his lifetime.

From 1778 onward, Lichtenberg published the Göttinger Taschen Calender and contributed to the Göttingisches Magazin der Wissenschaften und Literatur, which he edited for three years (1780–1782) with J. G. A. Forster. The Göttinger Taschen Calender, beside being a usual Calendar for everyday usage, contained not only short writings on natural phenomena and new scientific discoveries (which would be termed popular science today), but also essays in which he contested quackery and superstition. It also contained attacks on the “Sturm und Drang” writers. In the spirit of the Age of Enlightenment, he strove to educate the common people to use logic, wit and the power of their own senses.

In 1784, he took over the publication of the textbook Anfangsgründe der Naturlehre ("Foundations of the Natural Sciences") from his friend and colleague Johann Christian Erxleben upon his premature death in 1777. Until 1794, three further editions followed, which for many years, remained the standard textbook for physics in German.

From 1794 to 1799, he published an Ausführliche Erklärung der Hogarthischen Kupferstiche, in which he described the satirical details in William Hogarth's prints.

== Legacy ==
Lichtenberg's notebooks later garnered him a reputation among many notable German-speaking thinkers, and it is for these that he is today mainly remembered. Arthur Schopenhauer admired Lichtenberg greatly for what he had written in his notebooks. He called him one of those who "think ... for their own instruction", who are "genuine 'thinkers for themselves' in both senses of the words". Ludwig Wittgenstein wrote that "Lichtenberg’s wit is the flame that can burn on a pure candle only" and Johann Wolfgang von Goethe favourably remarked that "We can use Lichtenberg's writings as the most marvelous divining-rod; where he makes a joke, a problem lies hidden".

Other admirers of Lichtenberg's notebooks include Friedrich Nietzsche, Sigmund Freud, and Jacques Barzun.

Sigmund Freud (in his "Why War?” letter to Albert Einstein) mentioned Lichtenberg's invention of a "Compass of Motives" in a discussion on the combination of human compounded motives and quoted him as saying, "The motives that lead us to do anything might be arranged like the thirty-two winds and might be given names on the same pattern: for instance, 'food-food-fame' or 'fame-fame-food'.” Freud also quotes Lichtenberg on various occasions in his Jokes and Their Relation to the Unconscious.

Lichtenberg is not read by many outside Germany. Leo Tolstoy held Lichtenberg's writings in high esteem, expressing his perplexity of "why the Germans of the present day neglect this writer so much." The Chinese scholar and wit Qian Zhongshu quotes the Scrapbooks in his works several times.

As a physicist, Lichtenberg is remembered for his investigations in electricity, for discovering branching discharge patterns on dielectrics, now called Lichtenberg figures. In 1777, he built a large electrophorus to generate static electricity through induction. One of the largest made, it was 2 metres (6 ft 7 in) in diameter and could produce 38-centimetre (15 in) sparks. With it, he discovered the basic principle of modern xerography copy machine technology. By discharging a high voltage point near an insulator, he was able to record strange, tree-like patterns in fixed dust. These Lichtenberg figures are considered today to be examples of fractals.

A crater on the Moon is named Lichtenberg in his honour. 7970 Lichtenberg, a main belt asteroid discovered in 1960 is named after him.

He proposed a paper size system based on an aspect ratio equal to √2:1, which is the basis for the international standard paper sizes used today, of which A4 is the most commonly used.

Robert Wichard Pohl, a 20th-century successor of Lichtenberg in Göttingen and one of the founders of solid state physics used a similar research programme, in which the experiment was an essential part of narrating scientific knowledge.

== Selected bibliography ==
Works published during his lifetime

- Briefe aus England, 1776–78
- Über Physiognomik, wider die Physiognomen, 1778
- Göttingisches Magazin der Wissenschaften und Litteratur, 1780–85 (ed. by Georg Christoph Lichtenberg and Georg Forster)
- Über die Pronunciation der Schöpse des alten Griechenlandes, 1782
- Ausführliche Erklärung der Hogarthischen Kupferstiche, 1794–1799

Complete works in German

- Schriften und Briefe, 1968–72 (4 vols., ed. by Wolfgang Promies)

English translations

- The Reflections of Lichtenberg, Swan Sonnenschein, 1908 (selected and translated by Norman Alliston).
- Lichtenberg's Visits to England, as Described in his Letters and Diaries, Oxford, The Clarendon Press, 1938 (trans. and ed., by Margaret L. Mare and W. H. Quarrell)
- The Lichtenberg Reader, Beacon Press, 1959 (trans. and ed. by Franz H. Mautner and Henry Hatfield), abridged as Lichtenberg: Aphorisms & Letters, Jonathan Cape, 1969, SBN 224-61286-7.
- The World of Hogarth. Lichtenberg's Commentaries on Hogarth's Engravings, Houghton Mifflin Company, 1966 (trans. by Innes and Gustav Herdan)
- Hogarth on High Life. The Marriage à la Mode Series, from Georg Christoph Lichtenberg's Commentaries, 1970 (trans. and ed. by Arthur S. Wensinger and W. B. Coley)
- Aphorisms, Penguin, 1990 (trans. with an introduction and notes by R. J. Hollingdale), ISBN 0-14-044519-6, reprinted as The Waste Books, 2000, ISBN 978-0-940322-50-9
- G.C. Lichtenberg: Philosophical Writings, (trans. and ed. by Steven Tester), Albany: State University of New York Press, 2012.
