= John Norris =

John or Jack Norris may refer to:

== Law and politics ==
- John Norris (died 1577), MP for Downton, Taunton and Bodmin
- Sir John Norris (Royal Navy officer) (1670/71–1749), British admiral, Member of Parliament for Rye and Portsmouth
- John Norris (1685–1752), Member of Parliament for Chippenham
- John Norris (1702–1767), Member of Parliament for Rye
- John Norris (1721–1786), High Sheriff of Buckinghamshire
- John Norris (born 1740), Member of Parliament for Rye
- John Thomas Norris (1808–1870), MP for Abingdon

== Sports ==
- Jack Norris (footballer) (1923–2015), Australian rules footballer
- Jack Norris (ice hockey) (born 1942), Canadian ice hockey player
- Jac Norris (born 2006), Welsh footballer

== Others ==
- John Norris (soldier) or Norreys (ca. 1547–1597), English soldier
- John Norris (philosopher) (1657–1711), English philosopher and poet
- John Norris (1721–1786), English merchant and member of the Hellfire Club
- John S. Norris (1804–1876), American architect
- John Norris (priest) (1823–1891), English archdeacon
- J. Frank Norris (John Franklyn Norris, 1877–1952), American fundamentalist preacher
- John Norris (publisher) (1934–2010), Canadian publisher, editor, music critic, and record producer
- John Norris (reporter) (born 1959), American music journalist
- Jack Norris (activist) (born 1967), American dietitian and animal rights activist

== See also ==
- John Norreys (disambiguation)
