= Spy (disambiguation) =

A spy is a person engaged in espionage, obtaining information that is considered secret or confidential.

Spy may also refer to:

== Film ==
- An English translation of the title for Spione, the 1928 German espionage thriller silent film by Fritz Lang
- Spy (2015 film), an American comedy starring Melissa McCarthy
- S*P*Y*S, a 1974 American comedy film
- Spy (2023 film), an Indian Telugu film starring Nikhil Siddhartha

== Literature ==
- Spy, a novel in the Alex Hawke series by Ted Bell
- Spy: The Inside Story of How the FBI's Robert Hanssen Betrayed America
- Spy (magazine), a satirical monthly

== Music ==
- Spys (band), a New York band
- Spy (Carly Simon album), 1979
- "The Spy (The Doors song)", 1970
- "Spy", a song by They Might Be Giants from the album John Henry
- "Spy", a song by Shakira featuring Wyclef Jean from the 2009 album She Wolf
- "Spy", the titular song on Carly Simon 1979 album Spy
- "Spy" (Super Junior song), a 2012 song by South Korean boy band Super Junior
- "iSpy" (Kyle song), a 2016 song by Kyle featuring Lil Yachty

== People ==
- S.P.Y (born 1976), a London-based Drum and Bass producer/DJ
- Leslie Ward (1851–1922), a British cartoonist
- J. Ralph (born 1975), an American musician

== Ships ==
- Spy (ship), several commercial ships
- HMS Spy, two ships of the Royal Navy

== Television ==
- Spy (2004 TV series), a British reality series that premiered on BBC3 in 2004
- Spy (2011 TV series), a British comedy series that premiered on Sky1 and Hulu in 2011
- Spy (2015 TV series), a South Korean action series, also stylised as SPY
- The Spy (miniseries), a 2019 web television miniseries based on the life of Israel's top Mossad spy Eli Cohen

== Other uses ==
- Spy (gridiron football), a defensive football role
- Spy (Team Fortress 2), a playable class in the video game
- Spy, Belgium, a village
- Northern Spy, a variety of apple
- SPDR S&P 500 ETF Trust, an exchange-traded fund

== See also ==
- The Spy (disambiguation)
- SPY (disambiguation)
- Spies (disambiguation)
- Spy vs. Spy, a comic strip
- Spy fiction
- The Secret Agent (disambiguation)
