= John Norris (1702–1767) =

British customs official and politician

John Norris (1702–1767) was a British customs official and politician who sat in the House of Commons from 1727 to 1732.

== Early life ==
Norris was baptized on 31 July 1702, the third, but eldest surviving son of Admiral Sir John Norris and his wife Elizabeth Aylmer, daughter of Admiral Matthew Aylmer. He married Judith Western, daughter of Robert Western on 13 January 1729.

== Politics ==
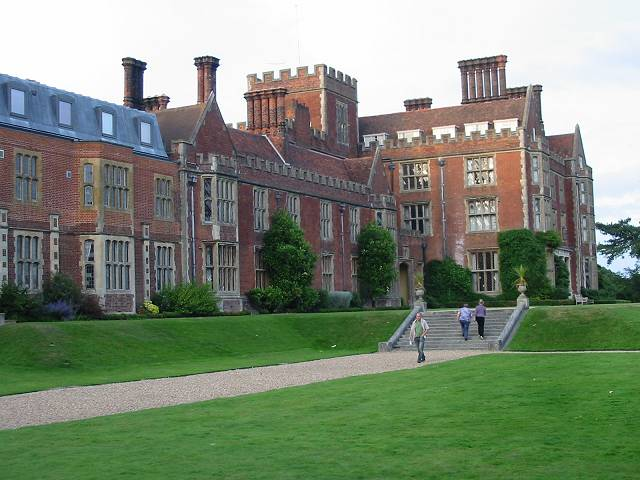
Hemsted Park, Kent

At the 1727 British general election, Norris was returned unopposed as Member of Parliament for Rye on his father's interest. He voted regularly with the Opposition and spoke against the Government on the Address in January. 1729, and on the Hessians and Dunkirk, in February 1730. On 21 April 1730 he took the ministry by surprise by moving for an address to lay before the House any secret articles to the treaty of Seville, which resulted in a four hours’ debate His last reported speech was made against the Government on the payment of a debt to Denmark in March 1732. Later in 1732, he succeeded to a reversionary grant, to a post as usher of the customs house in the Port of London which disqualified him from sitting in Parliament. He accordingly vacated his seat in September 1732.

Norris succeeded his father to Hempstead Park in 1749. He died on 12 November 1767, leaving a son John, who was later an MP, and a daughter.

Parliament of Great Britain
Preceded by Phillips Gybbon; The Lord Aylmer	Member of Parliament for Rye; 1727– 1732; With: Phillips Gybbon	Succeeded by Phillips Gybbon; Matthew Norris
