= Phillips Gybbon =

18th-century English Whig politician

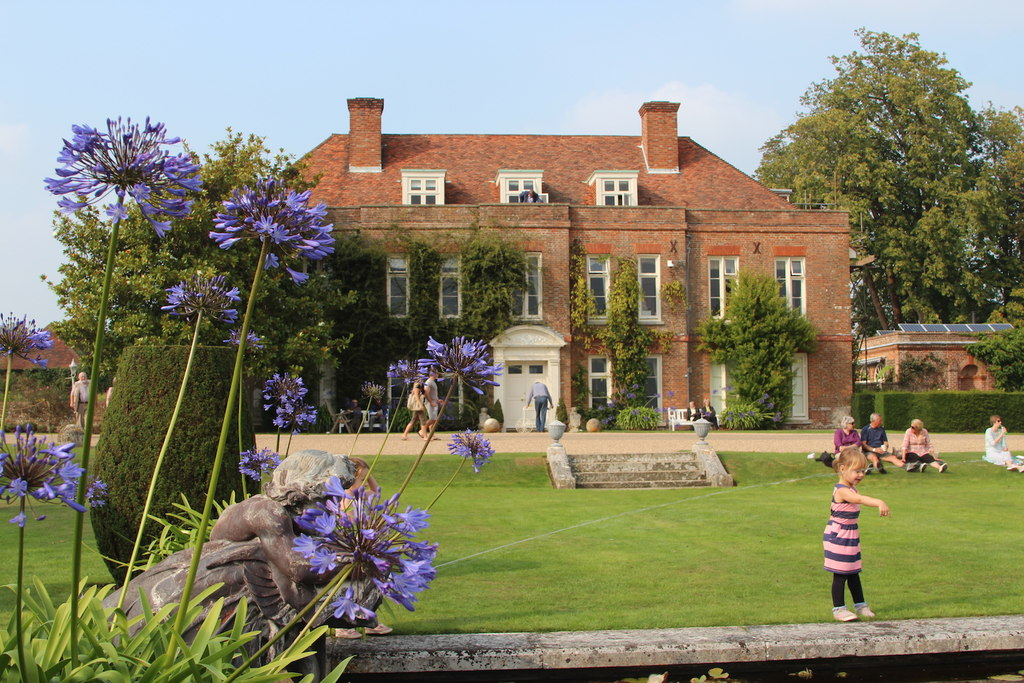
- Hole Park, Rolvenden

Member of Parliament for Rye
- In office 1707–1762

Personal details
- Born: 11 October 1678
- Died: 12 March 1762 (aged 83)
- Party: Whig
- Children: 1 daughter

Phillips Gybbon (11 October 1678 – 12 March 1762), of Hole Park, Rolvenden, in Kent, was an English Whig politician who sat in the House of Commons between 1707 and 1762.

Gybbon was the son of Robert Gybbon of Hole Park, and his wife Elizabeth Phillips, daughter of John Phillips of St. Clement Danes. He travelled abroad in Holland and Germany and entered Middle Temple in 1694. He succeeded his father in 1719.

Gybbon entered Parliament in 1707 as Whig Member of Parliament for Rye, and represented the constituency until his death 55 years later, eventually becoming Father of the House of Commons from 1749. Early in his career he was appointed a Commissioner of Revenue in Ireland, and in the 1720s was Chairman of the Committee of Privileges and Elections. From 1726 to 1730, he was Surveyor-General of Land Revenues. For the next few years he was in opposition, supporting Pulteney against Robert Walpole's administration. On Walpole's fall in 1742, Gybbon was appointed a Lord of the Treasury in Wilmington's government, retaining the post after Henry Pelham replaced Wilmington in 1743 but losing office in the reshuffle after Carteret was sacked at the end of 1744.

He died in 1762, having married Catherine, the daughter of Honor Bier, with whom he had an only daughter. She left Hole Park to a Mrs Jefferson who was married to a John Beardsworth.

Parliament of Great Britain
Preceded by Philip Herbert; Edward Southwell	Member of Parliament for Rye; 1707–1762; With: Edward Southwell 1707–1708; Admiral Sir John Norris 1708–1722; The Lord Aylmer 1722–1727; John Norris 1727–1733; Matthew Norris 1733–1734; Admiral Sir John Norris 1734–1749; Thomas Pelham 1749–1754; George Onslow 1754–1761; Captain John Bentinck 1761–1762	Succeeded by John Norris; Captain John Bentinck
Preceded by Sir Richard Shuttleworth	Father of the House; 1749–1762	Succeeded by Sir John Rushout, 4th Baronet
