= Spiessens =

Spiessens is a surname. Notable people with the surname include:

- Alfons Spiessens, Belgian athlete
- Lani Spiessens (born 2008), Belgian gymnast

== Other uses ==
- Rotan Spiessens–Hot Dog Louis (1995), Belgian cycling team

== See also ==
- Spiess (disambiguation)
