= 3–4 defense =

American football defensive formation

In American football, the 3–4 defense is a common defensive alignment consisting of three down linemen and four linebackers. It is called a "base defense" because it will readily switch to other defensive alignments (such as a nickel defense or a dime defense) as circumstances change. Alternatively, some defenses use a 4–3 defense: four down linemen and three linebackers.

3–4 base defense (blue) matched up with an offset I formation offense (orange)

== Overview ==
The 3–4 defense incorporates three defensive linemen – two defensive ends and one nose tackle, who line up opposite the other team's offensive line. Those three players are responsible for engaging the other team's offensive line, allowing the linebackers to read their keys and/or execute their assignment. While the role of the defensive linemen is generally consistent, the linebackers allow for the flexibility and versatility of the 3–4 scheme, and give defensive coaches nearly limitless options to confuse the other team's players and coaches. Depending on the situation, any number of linebackers can blitz, fake a blitz, "spy" the quarterback or running back, or cover receivers. In key situations, a rush linebacker may be sent to cover the flat on the opposite side of the blitzing defensive back; this is called a "zone blitz".

After becoming the predominant defensive alignment in the late 1970s and early 1980s, the 3–4 defense declined in popularity over the next two decades, but experienced a resurgence in the 2000s among both professional and college football teams. As of 2025, NFL teams that regularly incorporate the 3–4 defensive alignment scheme as a base include the Los Angeles Rams, Los Angeles Chargers, Seattle Seahawks, Pittsburgh Steelers, Baltimore Ravens, Atlanta Falcons, New York Giants, Minnesota Vikings, Miami Dolphins, Tampa Bay Buccaneers, Denver Broncos, New England Patriots, Tennessee Titans, Philadelphia Eagles, Carolina Panthers and Arizona Cardinals.

The 3–4 defense was originally devised by Bud Wilkinson at the University of Oklahoma in the 1940s as the 5–2 Oklahoma defense. The first NFL team to regularly employ the 3–4 was the 1974 New England Patriots under Chuck Fairbanks, who employed the 5–2 for all but one of his six seasons (1967–72) as head coach of the Oklahoma Sooners (the 1971 Sooners employed the 4–3).

The 1972 Miami Dolphins were the first team to win a Super Bowl with the 3–4 defense, going undefeated and using number 53, Bob Matheson, as a down lineman or rushing linebacker. Matheson replaced defensive tackle Bob Heinz, shifting Manny Fernandez to nose guard.

In 1976, Oakland Raiders coach John Madden switched to the 3–4 after injuries decimated the team's defensive line. The Raiders went 13–1 in the regular season and defeated the Minnesota Vikings in Super Bowl XI.

The Dolphins shifted full-time to the 3–4 under Arnsparger in 1977, with Bob Baumhower anchoring the defense as a perennial All-Pro nose tackle.

The Pittsburgh Steelers have used the 3–4 as their base defense since 1982, the season after Hall of Fame defensive tackle Joe Greene and end L. C. Greenwood retired. In fact, the Steelers were the only NFL team to use the 3–4 defense during the 2001 season, but finished the season as the number one defense in the NFL. It is believed that the Steelers' success with the 3–4 defense is the primary reason why many NFL teams have started returning to the formation.

When the Raiders defeated the Philadelphia Eagles in Super Bowl XV, it marked the first Super Bowl in which both teams used the 3–4 as their base defense. Also notable several years later, the Big Blue Wrecking Crew, the defensive unit for the 1986 New York Giants who won Super Bowl XXI, was a 3–4 defense and featured all-time great Lawrence Taylor at right outside linebacker and fellow Hall of Famer Harry Carson on the inside. By the mid-1990s, only a few teams used a 3–4 defense, most notably the Buffalo Bills and Pittsburgh Steelers.

== Defensive line ==
A lone nose tackle in the 3–4 base defense, flanked by two defensive ends

The nose tackle and the inside linebackers, those are three guys that are very important. But when you go through it, the nose tackle is probably the single-most important guy.

— Joe Collier, Denver Broncos assistant (1969–1988), architect of the "Orange Crush Defense".

The defensive line is made up of a nose tackle (NT) and two defensive ends (DEs). Linemen in 3–4 schemes tend to be larger than their 4–3 counterparts to take up more space and guard more territory along the defensive front. As a consequence, many 3–4 defensive linemen begin their NFL careers as 4–3 defensive tackles, as younger players typically do not possess the size, weight, and strength to play on a 3–4 defensive front. They must be strong at the point of attack and are aligned in most cases head-up on an offensive tackle. First and foremost, they must control run gaps. Size and strength become more of a factor for linemen in 3–4 defenses than in 4–3 defenses because they move primarily within the confines of line play and seldom are in space using athletic ability. Ideally 3–4 DEs should weigh 285–310 pounds (129–141 kg) and be able to beat double teams by getting a push. Albert Breer noted, "In general, ideal front-seven players in the 3–4 are bigger and need to take on and defeat blocks more often in the running game."

The 3–4 nose tackle is considered the most physically demanding position in football. His primary responsibility is to control the "A" gaps, the two openings between the center and guards, This is called 2 gapping. They want to get "Knock back" by reestablishing the line of scrimmage in the opponents backfield and not get pushed back into his linebackers. If a running play comes through one of those gaps, he must make the tackle or control what is called the "jump-through"—the guard or center who is trying to get out to the linebackers. The ideal nose tackle has to be much bigger than 4–3 DTs, weighing around 335 pounds or more. An AFC Personnel director used Ted Washington as an example of an ideal nose tackle: "In his prime, Ted Washington was the ideal guy. He was huge, had long arms, and you couldn't budge him. He could hold off a 320-pound lineman with one hand and make the tackle with the other."

The base position of NT is across from the opposing team's center. This location is usually referred to as zero technique. The two DEs flank the NT and line up off the offensive Tackles. The location off the offensive guard is usually referred to as 4, 5, or 6 Techniques.

== Linebackers ==
Linebackers in the 3–4 base defense

I think good coaches will coach with the personnel they have, and if you only have one (good) linebacker, you're not going to play a 3–4.

— Hank Bullough, who installed one of the first 3–4 defenses with the New England Patriots.

In a 3–4 defense, four linebackers (LBs) are positioned behind the defensive line. The linebacker unit is made up of two inside linebackers (ILBs) flanked by two outside linebackers (OLBs). The OLBs often line up closer to the line of scrimmage than the ILBs, but may also be positioned at the same depth or deeper in coverage than the ILBs (though this is somewhat rare).

There are two types of ILBs, the Mike (for strong side) and the Will (for weak side). The Will typically is the more athletic linebacker, who can blitz, drop into coverage, play the run, and "spy" the quarterback. The Mike is typically the stronger and larger of the two linebackers, and is used almost like a fullback on the defense. He takes on and occupies blockers for the Will, allowing the Will to flow to the ball and make tackles.

The 3–4 also has two types of OLBs. The Joker, Jack, Buck, or Elephant is usually the primary pass rusher. Depending on the scheme, the Joker can be on either side of the defensive formation. He must be an excellent pass rusher, and has to be able to beat both stronger right tackles and rangier left tackles off the edge of the formation. The other 3–4 OLB, the Sam, does not have a specific designation. Like a Sam linebacker in a 4–3 scheme, the other 3–4 OLB must be able to cover, blitz, and play the run.

Strengths of the 3–4 include speedy ILBs and OLBs in pursuit of backs in run defense and flexibility to use multiple rushers to confuse the quarterback during passing plays without being forced into man-to-man defense on receivers. Most teams try to disrupt the offense's passing attack by rushing four defenders. In a standard 4–3 alignment, these four rushers are usually the four down linemen. But in a 3–4, the fourth rusher is usually a linebacker, though many teams use a safety to blitz and confuse the coverage, giving them more defensive options in the same 3–4 look. However, since there are four linebackers and four defensive backs, the fourth potential rusher can come from any of eight defensive positions. This is designed to confuse the quarterback's pre-snap defensive read.

A drawback of the 3–4 is that without a fourth lineman to take on the offensive blockers and close the running lanes, both the defensive linemen and the linebackers can be overwhelmed by blocking schemes in the running game. To be effective, 3–4 linebackers need their defensive line to routinely tie up a minimum of four (preferably all five) offensive linemen, freeing the linebackers to make tackles. The 3–4 linebackers must be very athletic and strong enough to shed blocks by fullbacks, tight ends, and offensive linemen to get to the running back. In most cases, 3–4 OLBs lead their teams in quarterback sacks.

Usually, teams that run a 3–4 defense look for college "tweeners"—defensive ends that are too small to play the position in the pros and not quite fluid enough to play outside linebacker in a 4–3 defense—as their 3–4 outside linebacker. The wisdom of this strategy is demonstrated in the career of Harry Carson, who played as a defensive lineman in his college career and then went on to become a Hall of Fame ILB for the New York Giants in the 1970s and '80s. According to NFL coach Wade Phillips, 3–4 linebackers "are a little bit cheaper, and you can find more of them," while "it's harder to find defensive linemen to play a 4–3 and pay for all of them."

== Secondary ==
Cornerbacks play similar roles in the 3–4 and 4–3 base defensive schemes.

Depending on the scheme, safeties may play mainly pass coverage or support the run heavily.

The 3–4 defense generally uses four defensive backs. Two of these are safeties, and two of them are cornerbacks. A cornerback's responsibilities vary depending on the type of coverage called. Coverage is simply how the defense will be protecting against the pass. The corners will generally line up 3 to 5 yards off the line of scrimmage, generally trying to "Jam" or interrupt the receivers' route within the first 5 yards. A corner will be given one of two ways to defend the pass (with variations that result in more or less the same responsibilities): zone and man coverage. In zone coverage, the cornerback is responsible for an area on the field. In this case, the corner must always stay downfield of whomever it is covering while still remaining in its zone. Zone is a more relaxed defensive scheme meant to provide more awareness across the defensive secondary while sacrificing tight coverage. As such, the corner in this case would be responsible for making sure nobody gets outside of him, always, or downfield of him, in cases where there is no deep safety help. In man coverage, however, the cornerback is solely responsible for the man across from him, usually the offensive player split farthest out.

The free safety is responsible for reading the offensive plays and covering deep passes. Depending on the defensive call, he may also provide run support. He is positioned 10 to 15 yards behind the line of scrimmage, toward the center of the field. He provides the last line of defense against running backs and receivers who get past the linebackers and cornerbacks. The 3-4 defense generally requires that the free safety be a quick and smart player, capable of making tackles efficiently as well as reading the play and alerting his team of game situations.

The strong safety is usually larger than the free safety and is positioned relatively close to the line of scrimmage. He is often an integral part of the run defense, but is also responsible for defending against a pass; especially against passes to the tight ends.

== One-gap versus two-gap 3–4 systems ==
The 3–4 has two basic defensive variations: the one-gap and the two-gap. In a two-gap system, the linemen are charged with tying up two blockers. This allows the linebackers to "flow downhill" and make tackles without shedding blocks. The one-gap, on the other hand, distributes the responsibility for gap coverage evenly between the linemen and linebackers. Each player has a few "key reads" after the ball is snapped. For example, the middle linebacker may be covering the strong-side A gap (gap between center and strong side guard). If he sees the guard move right, then he flows with the guard, moving more or less laterally parallel to the line of scrimmage. If the guard moves left, he attacks downhill (perpendicular to the line of scrimmage) and "shoots his gap." Responsibilities in the one-gap vary depending on the defense.

Very few teams use purely one or two-gap systems in today's NFL. However, the majority of teams, such as the Baltimore Ravens and Pittsburgh Steelers primarily use the two-gap 3–4. The Houston Texans and Denver Broncos primarily use the one-gap 3–4. The New York Jets use a versatile, hybrid defense combining one and two-gap looks.
