= Matthew Norris (Royal Navy officer) =

Captain Matthew Norris

Member of Parliament for Rye
- In office 1733–1734 Serving with Phillips Gybbon
- Preceded by: Phillips Gybbon; John Norris
- Succeeded by: Phillips Gybbon; Sir John Norris

Personal details
- Born: 12 July 1705
- Died: 27 December 1738 (aged 33)
- Spouse: Euphemia Morris (m. 1734)
- Relations: John Norris (brother); Matthew Aylmer, 1st Baron Aylmer (grandfather); John Norris Hewett (niece)
- Parent(s): Sir John Norris; Elizabeth Aylmer

Matthew Norris (July 1705 – 27 December 1738) was a Royal Navy officer and politician who sat in the House of Commons from 1733 to 1734.

== Early life ==
Norris was baptized on 12 July 1705, the fifth son of Admiral of the Fleet Sir John Norris, and his wife Elizabeth Aylmer, daughter of Admiral Matthew Aylmer. His parents country home was Hemsted Park in Kent, where his father died in 1749. Among his siblings were fellow MP John Norris, Vice Admiral Henry Norris and Captain Richard Norris.

His niece was the art collector and amateur artist John Norris Hewett.

== Career ==
He joined the Royal Navy and became Captain in 1724.

Norris was returned unopposed as Member of Parliament for Rye at a by-election on 21 January 1733 in succession to his brother John Norris who had taken up an official post in the Customs. While in Parliament, he put in an impassioned "appeal for American freedom." At the 1734 British general election, he was replaced as MP for Rye by his father.

Norris was appointed to the New York station, where he arrived on 26 July 1734 aboard HMS Tartar. By 1734, he was married the daughter of a prominent landowner and colonial politician. Norris became a freeman of New York on account of his marriage and also because he vigorously opposed a bill in favour of the sugar colonies. In 1737 he became Commissioner of the Navy at a salary of £500 per annum.

== Personal life ==
By 1734, Norris was married to Euphemia Morris (c. 1710–1756), a daughter of Lewis Morris of Morrisania, New York. His father-in-law was a member of the New York General Assembly and served as Governor of New Jersey. Among her siblings were Speaker of the New York General Assembly Lewis Morris, New Jersey Chief Justice Robert Hunter Morris, and sister Anne Morris (wife of Edward Antrill). Her maternal grandfather was James Graham, who served as Speaker of the Assembly and Recorder of New York City.

Norris died without issue on 27 December 1738. After his death, his widow lived in Trenton, New Jersey.

Parliament of Great Britain
Preceded by Phillips Gybbon; John Norris	Member of Parliament for Rye; 1733–1734; With: Phillips Gybbon	Succeeded by Phillips Gybbon; Admiral Sir John Norris
