= Spies (surname) =

Spies is a surname of German origin, and may refer to:

- August Spies (1855–1887), anarchist
- Ben Spies (born 1984), American motorcycle road racer
- Claudio Spies (1925–2020), American composer
- Dennis E. Spies (born 1968), American Catholic bishop
- Leo Spies (1899–1965), Russian-born German composer and conductor
- Liesbeth Spies (born 1966), Dutch politician
- Moritz Ritter von Spies (1805–1862), Bavarian Major General and War Minister
- Pierre Spies (born 1985), South African rugby player
- Simon Spies (1921–1984), Danish tycoon best known for starting the charter airline Spies Rejser
- Walter Spies (1895-1942), German painter
- Werner Spies (born 1937), German art historian

== See also ==
- Spies (disambiguation)
