= John Norris (Royal Navy officer) =

Royal Navy officer and politician (1670/71–1749)

Admiral of the Fleet The Right Honourable Sir John Norris
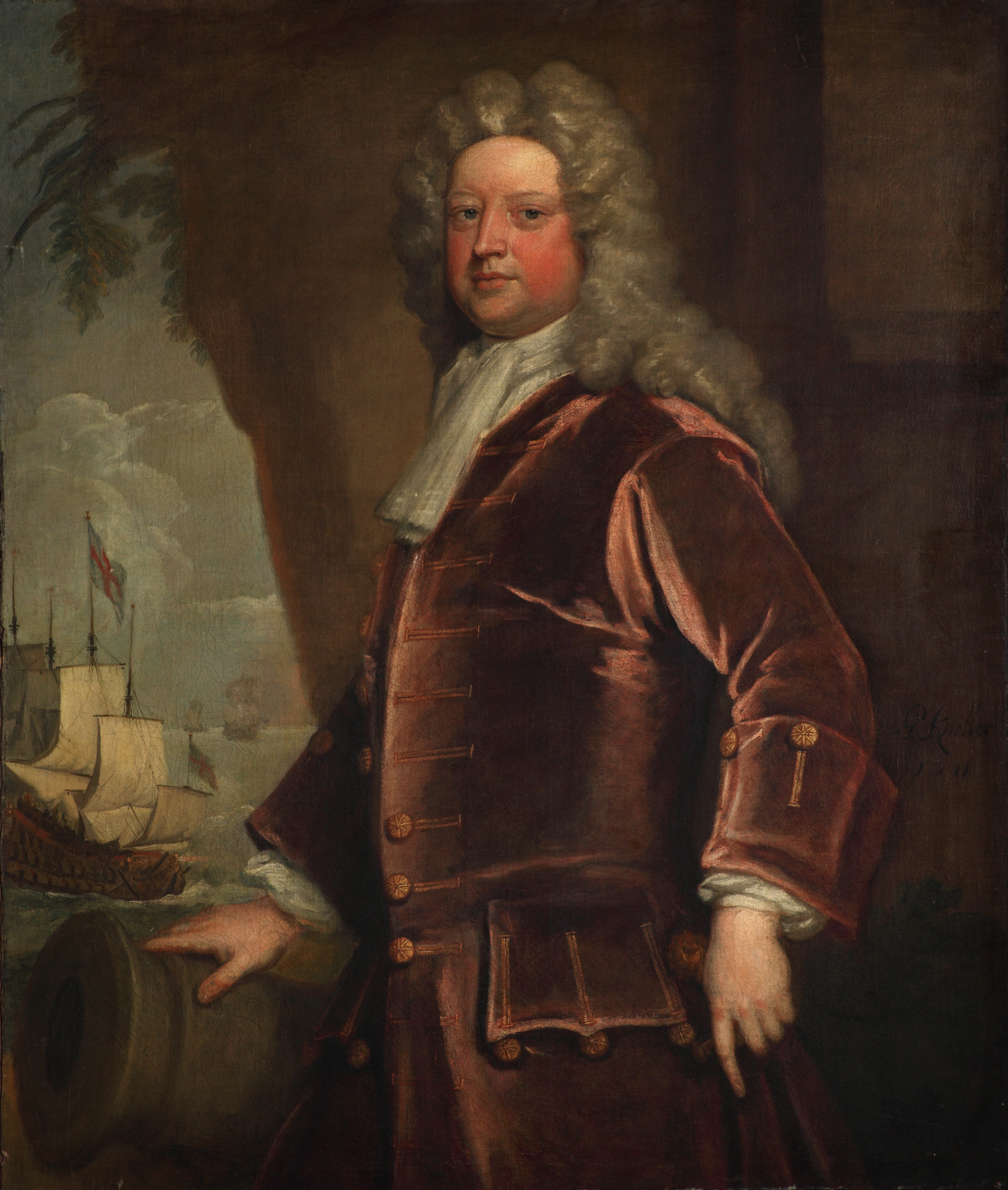
- Portrait by Sir Godfrey Kneller, 1711
- Born: 1670 or 1671
- Died: 13 June 1749; Hemsted Park, Benenden, Kent
- Burial place: St George's Church, Benenden, Kent
- Children: 5, including John
- Military career
- Allegiance: England; Great Britain
- Branch: Royal Navy
- Service years: 1680–1734
- Rank: Admiral of the Fleet
- Nickname: Foul-weather Jack
- Commands: HMS Pelican; HMS Spy; HMS Sheerness; HMS Royal Oak; HMS Sussex; HMS Russell; HMS Carlisle; HMS Content; HMS Winchester; HMS Orford; HMS Britannia; Mediterranean Fleet
- Conflicts: Nine Years' War; Battle of Beachy Head; Battle of Barfleur; Battle of Lagos; Williamite War in Ireland; War of the Spanish Succession; Battle of Cadiz; Battle of Malaga; Siege of Toulon; Great Northern War; War of Jenkins' Ear

Admiral of the Fleet Sir John Norris PC (1670 or 1671 – 13 June 1749) was a Royal Navy officer and Whig politician. After serving as a junior officer during the Nine Years' War and the Williamite War in Ireland, he was given command of a squadron sent to North America to protect British settlements on the banks of Hudson Bay in 1697. Although he developed a plan to recapture some territories in Newfoundland and Labrador taken by French forces the previous winter, he was prevented from implementing that plan when the local council overruled him.

Norris served under Admiral Sir George Rooke at the Battle of Cádiz at an early stage of the War of the Spanish Succession. He went on to command the vanguard at the Battle of Malaga in August 1704 and then served under Admiral the Earl of Peterborough at the capture of Barcelona in October 1705.

As a flag officer, Norris was sent with a fleet to the Baltic Sea to support a coalition of naval forces from Russia, Denmark and Hanover taking in the Great Northern War. Tsar Peter took personal command of the coalition fleet and appointed Norris as his deputy in 1716: together they protected British and other allied merchant vessels from attack by warships of the Swedish Empire. In November 1718, following the death of Charles XII of Sweden, Britain switched sides and Norris returned to the region to protect British merchant shipping from attack by Russian raiders. Norris also acted as a commissioner in the negotiations leading to the Treaty of Nystad which ended the War in September 1721.

Norris went on to be commander-in-Chief of the Channel Fleet at the outset of the War of Jenkins' Ear in 1739. In 1744 he was asked to defend Britain from an imminent French Invasion: he was preparing for battle against the French fleet, when storms intervened scattering the invasion transports, with heavy loss of life, thereby ending the immediate threat of invasion.

== Early career ==
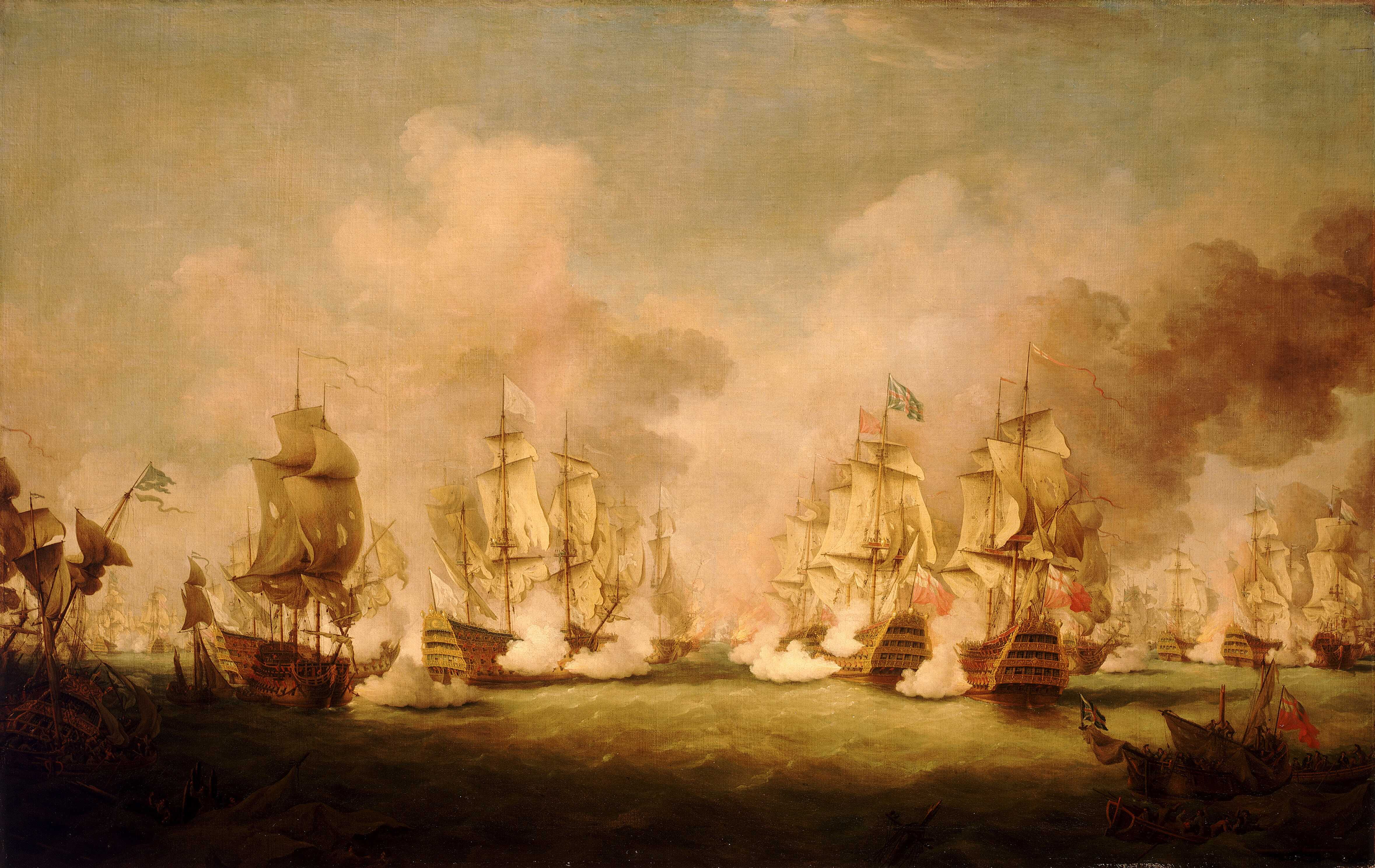
The Battle of Barfleur at which Norris saw action in command of a fire ship during the Nine Years' War

Born of uncertain Irish parentage, Norris joined the Royal Navy as a captain's servant in 1680. Promoted to lieutenant in August 1689, he joined the third-rate HMS Edgar commanded by Cloudesley Shovell during the Nine Years' War. He transferred to the third-rate HMS Monck early in 1690 and served off the Coast of Ireland during the Williamite War in Ireland. Promoted to commander on 8 July 1690, he was given command of the fire ship HMS Pelican and took part in the Battle of Beachy Head in July 1690 in another action of the Nine Years' War. He transferred to the command of the fire ship HMS Spy in December 1691 and saw action again at the Battles of Barfleur and La Hogue in May 1692.

Promoted to captain on 13 January 1693, Norris was given command of the fifth-rate HMS Sheerness and fought at the Battle of Lagos in June 1693. He transferred to the command of the third-rate HMS Royal Oak, then to the command of the third-rate HMS Sussex and then to the command of the second-rate HMS Russell and was deployed to the Mediterranean early in 1694. He transferred to the command of the fourth-rate HMS Carlisle and then to the command of the third-rate HMS Content in Spring 1695.

Norris was given command of a squadron sent to North America to protect British settlements on the banks of Hudson Bay in 1697. Although he developed a plan to recapture some territories in Newfoundland and Labrador taken by French forces the previous winter, he was prevented from implementing that plan when the local council overruled him and he received some criticism when he returned to England for his inaction. However he was defended by the Earl of Orford from potential dismissal, his successful career continued and he was given command of the fourth-rate HMS Winchester later in 1697. Investigations were restarted into his conduct in Newfoundland in early 1699 he was suspended from the navy in April 1699.

Norris was given command of the third-rate HMS Orford early in 1702 and served under Admiral Sir George Rooke at the Battle of Cádiz in August 1702 at an early stage of the War of the Spanish Succession. He went on to command the vanguard at the Battle of Malaga in August 1704. He was given command of the first-rate HMS Britannia, flagship of Admiral Sir Cloudesley Shovell, in 1703 and then served under Admiral the Earl of Peterborough at the capture of Barcelona in October 1705. Following his return to England he was knighted on 5 November 1705.

== Senior command ==
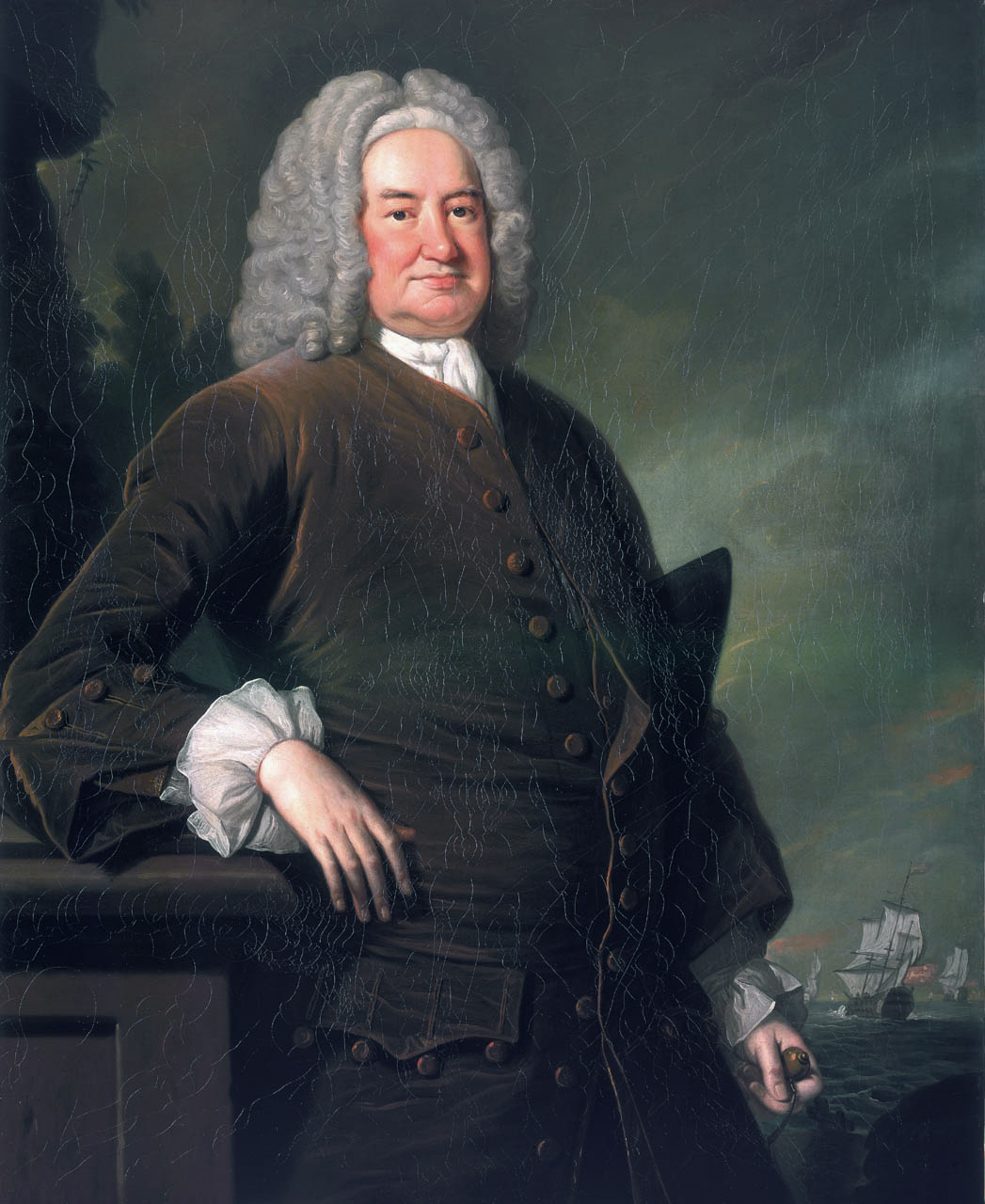
c. 1735 portrait of Norris by George Knapton

Promoted to rear admiral on 10 March 1707, Norris became second-in-command of the Mediterranean Fleet, with his flag in the third rate HMS Torbay. After taking part in the British defeat at the Battle of Toulon in July 1707 and, while sailing aboard his flagship HMS Torbay, Norris was present during the great naval disaster off the Isles of Scilly in October 1707 when Shovell and four of his ships were lost, claiming the lives of nearly 2,000 sailors. Promoted to vice admiral on 26 January 1708, Norris transferred his flag to the third-rate HMS Ranelagh. At the 1708 British general election, Norris was returned as Member of Parliament for Rye. He was a supporter of the Whig Junto, but while on active service, made little contribution in Parliament. While still serving as second-in-command of the Mediterranean Fleet, he took personal charge a squadron deployed to the Baltic Sea to prevent Swedish grain arriving in France in 1709. Promoted to full admiral on 21 December 1709, he became Commander-in-Chief of the Mediterranean Fleet early in 1710.

Norris was returned again as MP for Rye at the 1710 British general election. The new Tory Administration relieved him of the Mediterranean command in October 1711 which allowed him to devote more time to Parliamentary business. He followed the progress of the war and took an interest in naval matters. He voted with the Whigs for the motion ‘No Peace Without Spain’ on 7 December 1711 and against the French commerce bill on 18 June 1713. At the 1713 British general election, he was returned again as Whig MP for Rye, and voted against the expulsion of Richard Steele on 18 March 1714.

Norris was returned again for Rye at the 1715 British general election. With the new Whig Administration, he returned to active service. He was sent with a fleet to the Baltic Sea to support a coalition of naval forces from Russia, Denmark and Hanover taking in the Great Northern War. Tsar Peter took personal command of the coalition fleet and appointed Norris as his deputy in 1716: together they protected British and other allied merchant vessels from attack by warships of the Swedish Empire. Norris joined the Board of Admiralty led by the Earl of Berkeley in March 1718. In November 1718, following the death of Charles XII of Sweden, Britain switched sides and Norris returned to the region to protect British merchant shipping from attack by Russian raiders. Norris also acted as a commissioner in the negotiations leading to the Treaty of Nystad which ended the War in September 1721. At the 1722 British general election, he was returned unopposed as Member of Parliament for Portsmouth. and was advanced to Senior Naval Lord on the Admiralty Board in June 1727 but stood down as a Lord Commissioner of the Admiralty when the Walpole–Townshend Ministry fell in May 1730.

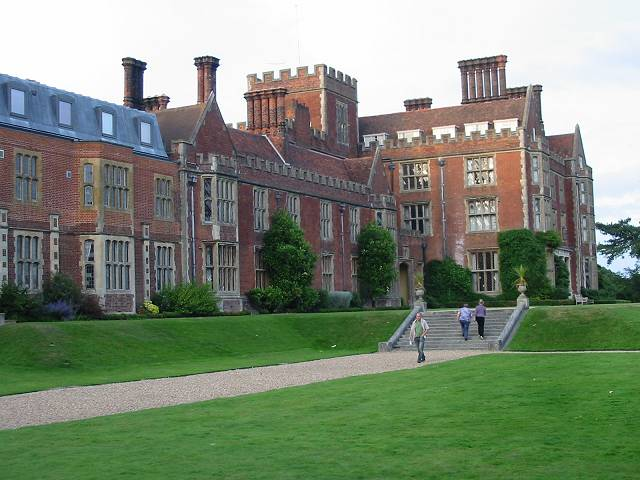
Norris's home, Hemsted Park in Kent (now occupied by Benenden School)

Norris lost his post as Lord on the Admiralty in 1730, and lost his command to Sir Charles Wager in 1731. In Parliament he joined the opposition and voted against the Government on the army in 1732 and on the Excise Bill in 1733. At the beginning of 1734, the government came to terms and he was promoted to Admiral of the Fleet on 20 February 1734 and, with his flag in HMS Britannia, he became commander-in-chief of a fleet sent to the Iberian Peninsula to protect Portugal from Spanish attack. He was returned as Member of Parliament for Rye again at the 1734 British general election. and was appointed Vice-Admiral of Great Britain in April 1739 and went on to be Commander-in-Chief of the Channel Fleet at the outset of the War of Jenkins' Ear in Autumn 1739.

In 1744 Norris was asked to defend Britain from an imminent French Invasion and in 1745 made Captain of Deal Castle. He was preparing for battle against the French fleet, when storms intervened scattering the invasion transports, with heavy loss of life, thereby ending the immediate threat of invasion. Norris retired from the navy later in the year.

Norris died at his country home, Hemsted Park in Kent, on 13 June 1749 and was buried at St George's Church in Benenden. His tomb was sculpted by Peter Scheemakers.

== Family ==
In May 1699 Norris married Elizabeth Aylmer, daughter of Admiral Matthew Aylmer; they had five children, including Vice Admiral Henry Norris, Captain Richard Norris, Rye MP John Norris, and Lucy Hewett (previously Dame Lucy Aylmer), mother of Sir FitzGerald Aylmer, 6th Baronet and artist John Norris Hewett.

== Sources ==
- Aldridge, David (2009). Admiral Sir John Norris and the British Naval Expeditions to the Baltic Sea 1715–1727 (PDF). Nordic Academic Press. ISBN 978-91-85509-31-7.
- Burke, John (2010). A Genealogical and Heraldic History of the Extinct and Dormant Baronetcies of England. Nabu Press. ISBN 978-1146796750.
- Heathcote, Tony (2002). The British Admirals of the Fleet 1734–1995. Pen & Sword. ISBN 0-85052-835-6.
- Rodger, N.A.M. (1979). The Admiralty. Offices of State. Lavenham: T. Dalton Ltd. ISBN 0900963948.
- Sobel, Dava (1998). Longitude: The True Story of a Lone Genius Who Solved the Greatest Scientific Problem of His Time. Fourth Estate, London. ISBN 1-85702-571-7.

Parliament of Great Britain
Preceded by Edward Southwell; Phillips Gybbon	Member of Parliament for Rye; 1708–1722; With: Phillips Gybbon	Succeeded by Phillips Gybbon; The Lord Aylmer
Preceded by Sir Edward Ernle, Bt; Sir Charles Wager	Member of Parliament for Portsmouth; 1722–1734; With: Sir Charles Wager	Succeeded by Thomas Lewis; Philip Cavendish
Preceded by Phillips Gybbon; Matthew Norris	Member of Parliament for Rye; 1734–1749; With: Phillips Gybbon	Succeeded by Phillips Gybbon; Thomas Pelham
Military offices
Preceded by Sir John Jennings	Senior Naval Lord; 1727–1730	Succeeded by Sir Charles Wager
Preceded by Sir George Byng	Admiral of the Fleet; 1734–1749	Succeeded by Sir Chaloner Ogle
Honorary titles
Preceded by Unknown	Vice-Admiral of Great Britain; 1739–1749	Succeeded by The Lord Anson
