= SPY =

SPY may refer to:

- SPDR S&P 500 Trust ETF, NYSE symbol
- Mowag Spy, a military vehicle
- SPY ACT (Securely Protect Yourself Against Cyber Trespass), a 2005 US proposed cyber-security regulation
- The IATA airport code for San Pédro Airport, Ivory Coastyobi

== See also ==
- Spy (disambiguation)
- AN/SPY-1 and AN/SPY-3, U.S. Navy radars
