= Charles Norris (etcher) =

British artist (1779–1858)

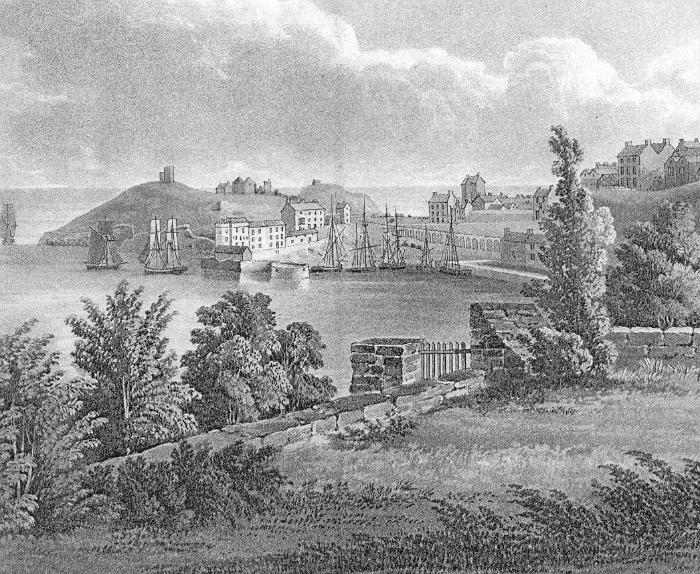
Tenby Harbour, 1817. Charles Norris

Charles Norris (24 August 1779 – 16 October 1858) was an English topographical etcher and writer who is best known for his landscape work of the Welsh countryside, especially the area around Tenby.

== History ==
Norris was born in London in 1779, to John Norris (1721–1786), a wealthy merchant, by his mistress Deborah Busby. In 1800, Charles Norris moved to Milford in Wales, but by 1810 he had moved further down the coast to Tenby. He came to note as an etcher of landscapes of the Pembrokeshire countryside, but mainly of Tenby. Norris is seen as an important recorder of Medieval buildings of Pembrokeshire, due to the lack of alternative recordings during the period.

In the late 1810s, Norris was given a plot of land by the Burgesses of Tenby, in recognition of his work in promoting the town. Norris used the land to construct Waterwynch House, a building that he lived in until his death in 1858. In 1920 Waterwynch House became the residence of Lord and Lady Risdale.

Many of Norris' original works are kept by Tenby Museum and Art Gallery.

== Notable works ==
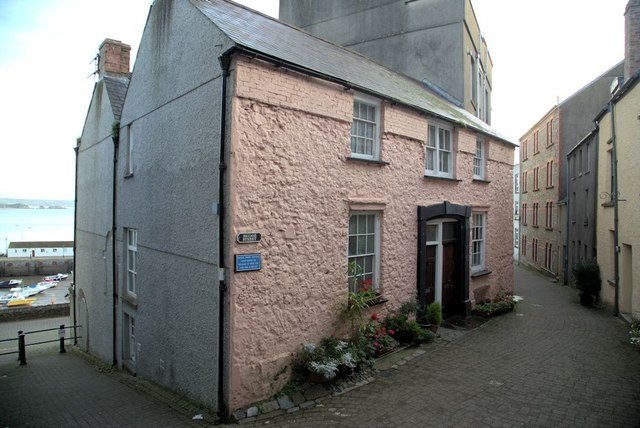
His house on Bridge Street in Tenby

- A Historical Account of Tenby (1818)

== Bibliography ==
- Leach, Arthur; Charles Norris 1779-1858 of Tenby and Waterwynch, (1949)
