= John Norreys =

John Norreys may refer to:

- Sir John Norris (soldier) or Norreys (c. 1547–1597), the son of Henry Norris, 1st Baron Norreys, a lifelong friend of Queen Elizabeth
- Sir John Norreys (Keeper of the Wardrobe) for Henry VI of England (c. 1400–1466)
- Sir John Norreys (Usher of the Chamber) (c. 1481–1564), English courtier
- Sir John Norreys (high sheriff) (died 1612), High Sheriff of Berkshire and Member of Parliament for Windsor, 1597–1601

== See also ==
- John Norris (disambiguation)
