= Spies =

Spies most commonly refers to people who engage in spying, espionage or clandestine operations.

Spies or The Spies may also refer to:

== Arts and media ==
=== Films ===
- Spies (1928 film), English title for Spione, a 1928 German film by Fritz Lang
- Spies (1943 film), an animated short film
- Spies, a 1993 Disney TV film starring Shiloh Strong
- Les Espions (The Spies), a 1957 French film
- The Spies (1919 film), a German crime film
- The Spies (2012 film), a South Korean film
- S*P*Y*S, a 1974 comedy film

=== Television ===
- Spies (TV series), a 1987 television series starring George Hamilton
- The Spies (TV series), 1965 British television series
- "Chapter 23: The Spies", an episode of The Mandalorian
- "Spies", an episode from Ben & Holly's Little Kingdom

=== Music ===
- Spies (band), a jazz fusion band
- Spys (band), an American rock band
- "Spies", a song by Coldplay from Parachutes
- "Spies" (Robbie Williams song), 2025

=== Novels ===
- Spies (novel), a 2002 novel by Michael Frayn
- Spies, a 1984 novel by Richard Sapir

== Other uses ==
- Spies (surname), a German surname

== See also ==
- Spiess (disambiguation)
- Spy (disambiguation)
- List of fictional secret agents
