= John Storr =

Officer in Britain's Royal Navy (1709–1783)

Rear-Admiral John Storr
- Born: 18 August 1709; Humbleton, East Riding of Yorkshire, England
- Died: 10 January 1783 (aged 73); London, England
- Resting place: Westminster Abbey
- Title: Rear-Admiral

Rear-Admiral John Storr (18 August 1709 – 10 January 1783) was an officer of the Royal Navy. He served during the Seven Years' War, reaching the rank of Rear admiral of the Red.

== Early life ==
Storr was born on 18 August 1709 at Humbleton, East Riding of Yorkshire, the son of Joseph Storr.

== Career ==
Storr was appointed commander on 3 July 1746, and captain on 1 November 1748. He was given command of HMS Gloucester on 1 November 1748, a position he held until 1753. He was later posted on HMS St George, a 90-gun second-rate ship, in January 1755, a post which he retained until the following year.

In 1757 he took command of HMS Revenge and kept it until 1760. On board, he took part in the Battle of Cartagena on 28 February 1758 off the Spanish port of Cartagena in the Mediterranean. A British fleet under the command of Admiral Osborn, who blocked the French fleet inside the port of Cartagena, attacked and defeated a French fleet under the orders of Michel-Ange Duquesne de Menneville, who had come to their aid. The interception of the French fleet was intended to limit the reinforcements sent to the aid of Louisbourg in North America, which was then besieged by the British.

He participated in the Battle of Quiberon Bay, 20 November 1759, still on HMS Revenge. He was then part of the Red Squadron, the central body of the fleet, under the command of Edward Hawke, admiral of the Blue.

From 1760 to 1762 he commanded HMS Monmouth. Storr was appointed rear admiral of the White, 19 March 1779 and then rear admiral of the Red, 26 September 1780.

== Personal life ==
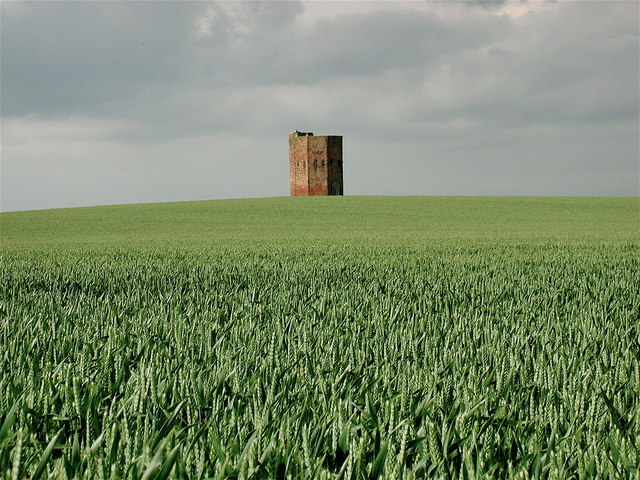
Admiral Storr's Tower, near Hilston

Storr married on 11 May 1773 at St George's Church, Bloomsbury, London. His wife was John Norris Gordon, noted at her death as an art collector and amateur artist.

Storr died on 10 January 1783 and was buried at Westminster Abbey. A marble tablet and bust was erected in the chapel of St John the Evangelist in Westminster Abbey in his memory.

An octagonal tower in Hilston, East Riding of Yorkshire, known as Admiral Storr's Tower, was built in 1750 as a look-out tower for Joseph Storr. This is now designated a Grade II listed building and recorded in the National Heritage List for England, maintained by Historic England.

== Biography ==
- Middleton, Richard (1985). "The Pitt-Newcastle Ministry and the Conduct of the Seven Years' War, 1757–1762". The Bells of Victory. Cambridge University Press. ISBN 0-521-26546-0.
