= Thomas Pelham, 1st Earl of Chichester =

British Whig politician

Thomas Pelham, 1st Earl of Chichester PC (28 February 1728 – 8 January 1805), known as the Lord Pelham of Stanmer from 1768 to 1801, was a British Whig politician.

== Background ==
Pelham was the son of Thomas Pelham and his wife Annetta, daughter of wealthy merchant George Bridges (d.1714) of Pera, Constantinople by his wife Anetta, a local girl. Sir John Pelham, 3rd Baronet, was his great-grandfather and Thomas Pelham-Holles, 1st Duke of Newcastle, and Henry Pelham his first cousins once removed. He was educated at Westminster School (1740) and Clare College, Cambridge (1745) and undertook the Grand Tour through France, Switzerland, Italy and Germany between 1746 and 1750.

== Political career ==
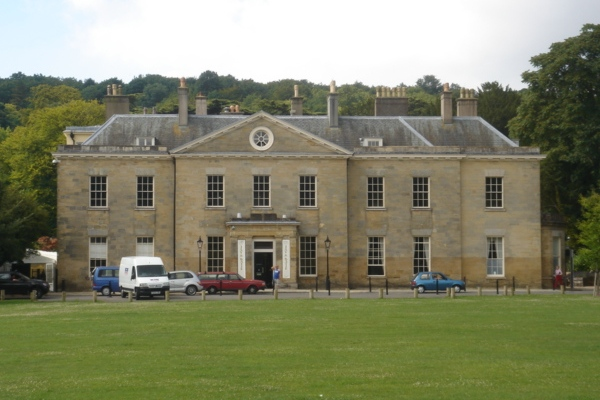
Stanmer House

Pelham was elected to the House of Commons for Rye in 1749, a seat he held until 1754, and then represented Sussex until 1768. He served as a Commissioner of Trade and Plantations from 1754 to 1761, as a Lord of the Admiralty from 1761 to 1762 and as Comptroller of the Household from 1765 to 1774 and was admitted to the Privy Council in 1765.

In 1768 Pelham succeeded his cousin the Duke of Newcastle as second Baron Pelham of Stanmer according to a special remainder in the letters patent. He also inherited the Pelham baronetcy created in 1611. Pelham also served as Surveyor-General of Customs of London from 1773 to 1805 and as the last Keeper of the Great Wardrobe from 1775 to 1782. In 1801 he was created Earl of Chichester.

In 1776, Pelham bought the manor of Falmer from his second cousin once removed, Sir John Shelley, 5th Baronet.

== Family ==
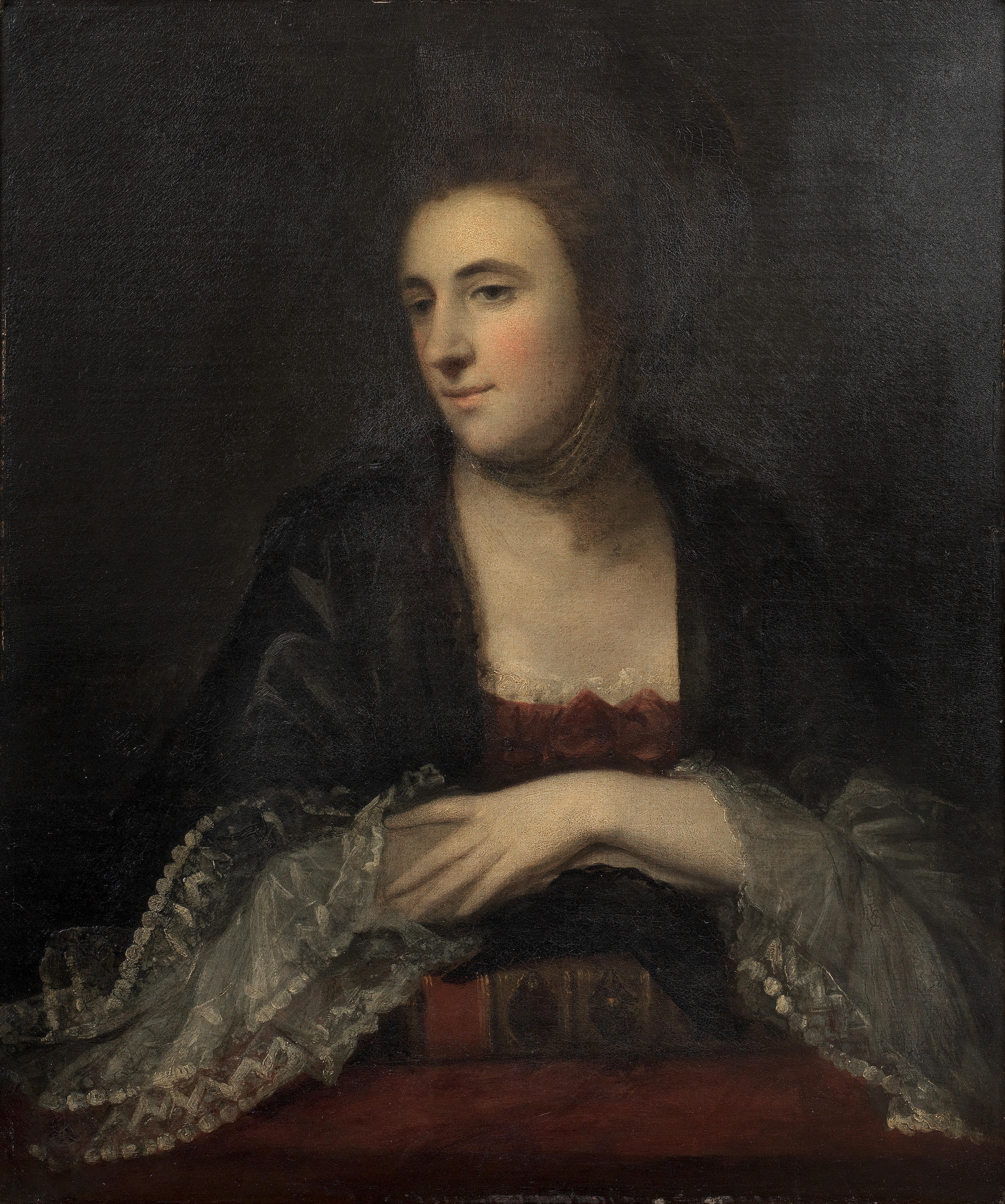
Mrs Thomas Pelham, later Countess of Chichester, paining by Sir Joshua Reynolds, c.1757.

He succeeded his father in 1737, inheriting the Stanmer Park estate near Lewes, Sussex.

Lord Chichester married Anne Frankland, daughter of Frederick Meinhardt Frankland, in 1754. They had three sons and three daughters. All three daughters and one son predeceased him. His third son the Right Reverend the Hon. George Pelham became Bishop of Bristol, Exeter and Lincoln. Lord Chichester died in January 1805, aged 76, and was succeeded in his titles by his eldest son Thomas, who became a prominent politician. Lady Chichester died in 1813.

== Coat of arms ==
Coat of arms of Thomas Pelham, 1st Earl of Chichester
Coronet A coronet of an Earl Crest A peacock in pride argent. Escutcheon Quarterly: 1st and 4th azure, three pelicans vulning themselves argent; 2nd and 3rd gules, two pieces of belts with buckles, erect in pale, the buckles upwards argent. Supporters Dexter, a horse of a mouse dun colour; Sinister, a bear proper, each collared with a belt, buckle and pendant or. Motto Vincit amor patriae (The love of my country will prevail). Badge The buckle of a belt or.

Parliament of Great Britain
Preceded by Phillips Gybbon; Sir John Norris	Member of Parliament for Rye; 1749–1754; With: Phillips Gybbon	Succeeded by Phillips Gybbon; George Onslow
Preceded by Henry Pelham; John Butler	Member of Parliament for Sussex; 1754–1768; With: John Butler 1754–1767; Lord George Lennox 1754–1768	Succeeded by Lord George Lennox; Richard Harcourt
Court offices
Preceded by Lord Charles Spencer	Comptroller of the Household; 1765–1774	Succeeded by Sir William Meredith
Preceded by The Earl of Ashburnham	Master of the Great Wardrobe; 1775–1782	Office abolished
Peerage of the United Kingdom
New creation	Earl of Chichester; 1801–1805	Succeeded by Thomas Pelham
Peerage of Great Britain
Preceded by Thomas Pelham-Holles	Baron Pelham of Stanmer (descended by acceleration); 1768–1801	Succeeded by Thomas Pelham
