= Camberley Obelisk =

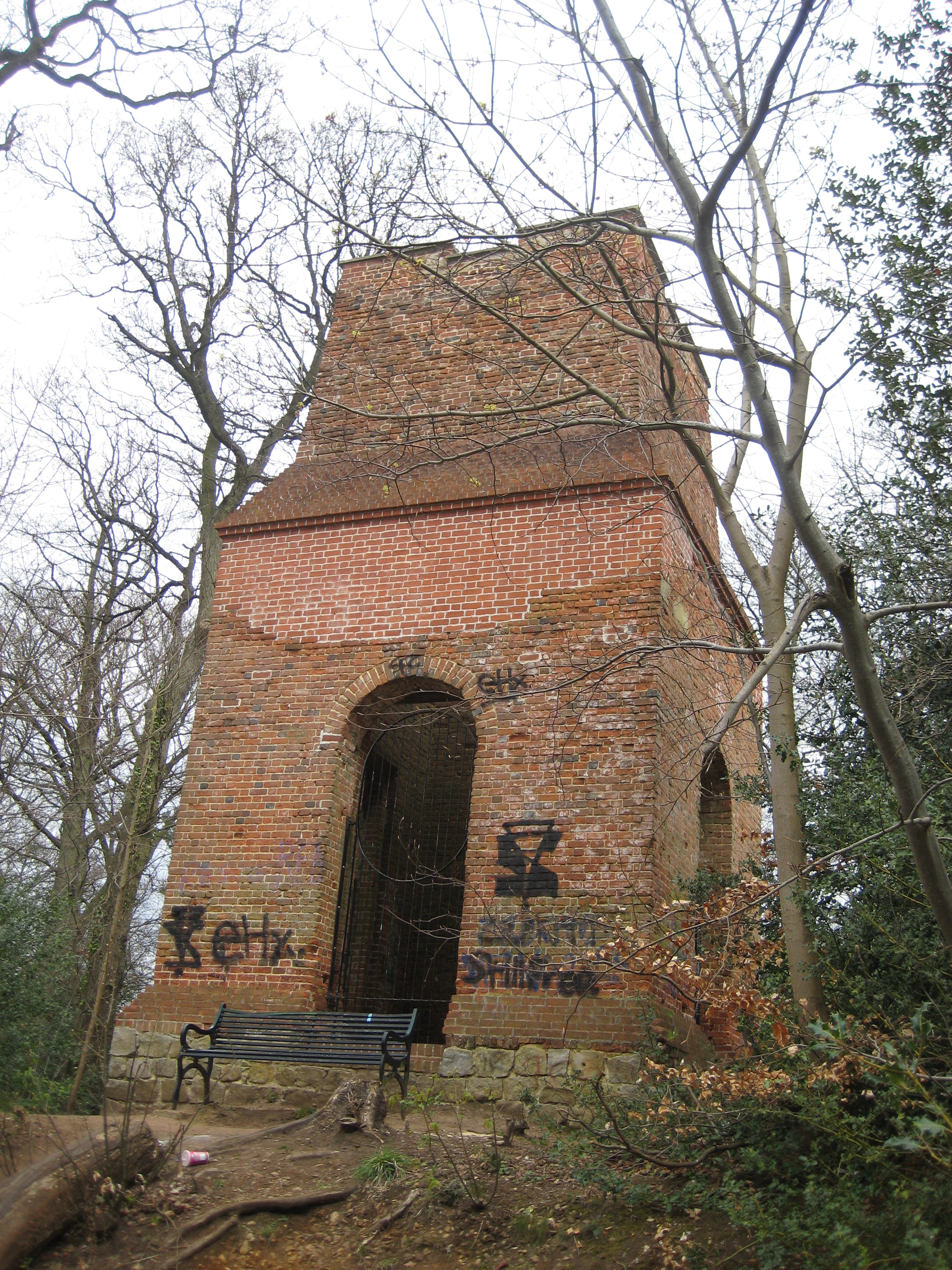
- View of Camberley Obelisk from the west, 2012

- Location within Surrey
- 51°20′25″N 0°44′21″W
- Type: Tower
- OS grid reference: SU 87915 60869

History
- Built: 1765–1770

Listed Building – Grade II
- Official name: Remains of obelisk in grounds of St Tarcissius School
- Designated: 19 July 1984
- Reference no.: 1377520

Camberley Obelisk (also known as Norris's Obelisk or Norris's Whim) is a brick tower at the top of a hill in Camberley, Surrey, England. The tower was built by John Norris (1721–1786) in about 1765–1770. The top section of the tower was destroyed by fire in the early 1880s. It is a Grade II listed building.

== Description ==
Although known as an obelisk, the structure is in fact a square tower, made of red bricks on a stone base. It is built on the top of a wooded hill in Camberley Park, about 200 yards (180 m) east of Camberley town centre.

The tower originally comprised several stories, and is estimated to have been about 100 feet (30 m) in height. However, the top part of the tower was demolished in the late 19th century, and it is now only 30 feet (9.1 m) high. The walls are up to 5 feet (1.5 m) thick. There was originally a wooden staircase inside the tower, allowing access to the top. The inside of the tower is now empty, and all the entrances have been closed off with iron grids.

== History ==
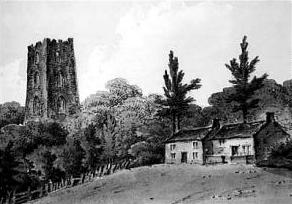
The Obelisk, painted by John Hassell in 1812

The tower was built about 1765–1770 by John Norris, a prosperous merchant and a member of the landed gentry who owned land and property in Warwickshire, Hampshire, Buckinghamshire and in Islington, and was High Sheriff for Buckinghamshire in 1775. He had two manors, Hawley Place in Hawley, Hampshire and Hughenden Manor in High Wycombe, Buckinghamshire. The tower is situated on top of a hill, about 2 miles (3.2 km) east of Norris' house in Hawley. At the time of its construction the town of Camberley had not yet been founded, and the area was open heathland. The hill on which the tower is situated overlooks the A30 road, which during the 18th century was the turnpike road between Exeter and London. The tower was the only conspicuous building in the area, and was a well-known landmark during the 18th and 19th centuries.

In 1801, the common on which the tower was located was enclosed, and the land around the tower was assigned to James Laurell of Frimley Park. However, Norris's eldest son, John Norris (d. 1848), who had inherited his father's lands and properties, gave Laurell four acres of farmland in Frimley in exchange for the land surrounding the tower.

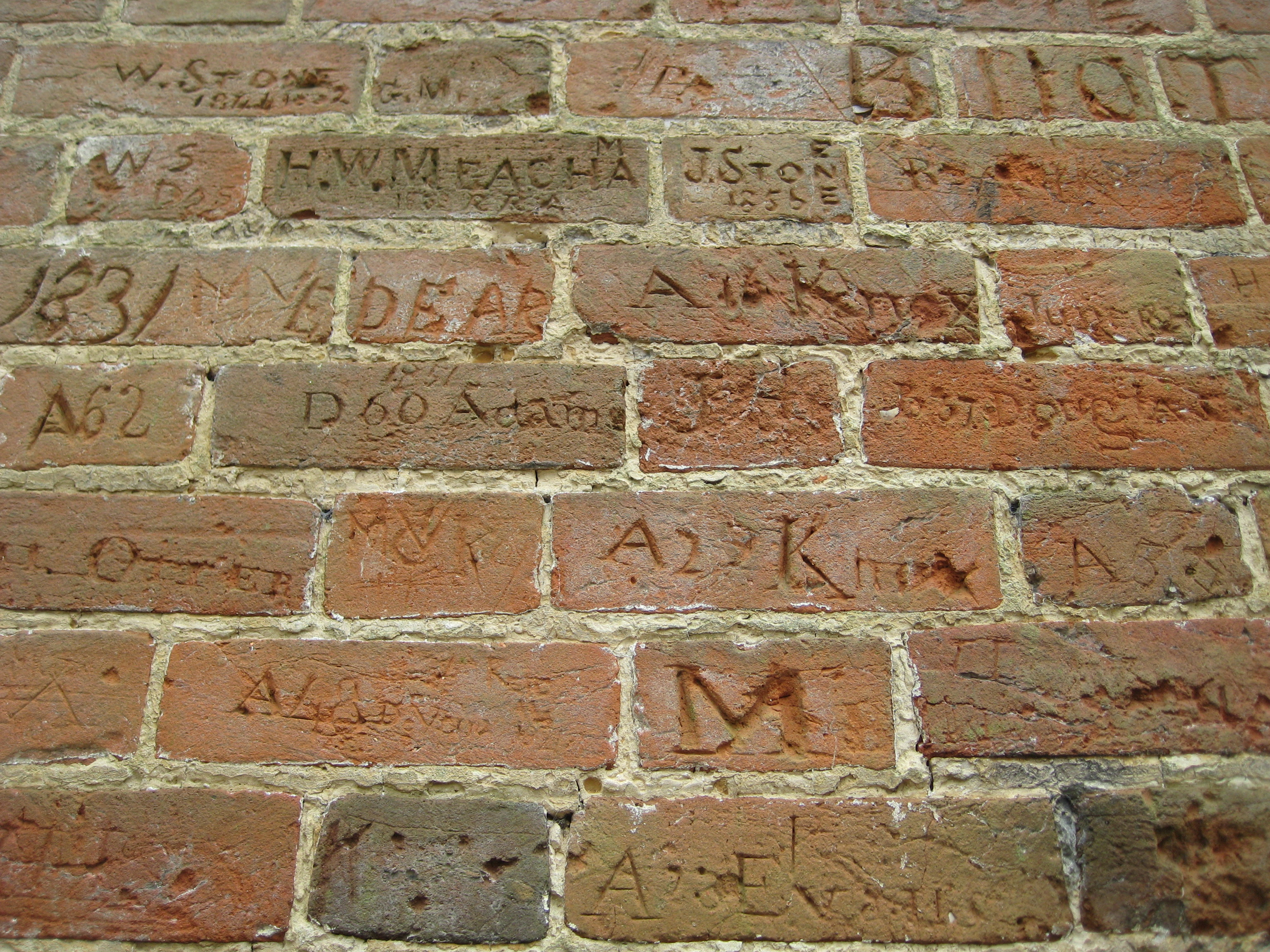
19th century graffiti on the outer wall of Camberley Obelisk

In 1812, the Royal Military College was established at Sandhurst on the other side of the turnpike road, and a settlement known as Cambridge Town (later becoming Camberley) grew up in the area to the west of the tower. During the 19th century cadets from the military college were required to climb up the hill to the tower as part of their surveying exercises, and the inner and outer walls of the tower are covered with graffiti carved into the bricks by cadets.

By the second half of the 19th century the tower had been incorporated into the grounds of a large house called The Knoll, which was used as a private girls' school during the early 20th century. At the start of the 1880s a campfire belonging to some gypsies camping at the tower had set fire to the wooden staircase, and the tower had become dangerously damaged. In 1882 the owner of The Knoll had the top section of the tower demolished in order to make it safe.

During the 20th century the hill on which the tower was situated became overgrown with trees, hiding the tower from general view. The tower opened to the public again in 2000 when Camberley Park was created.

== Purpose ==
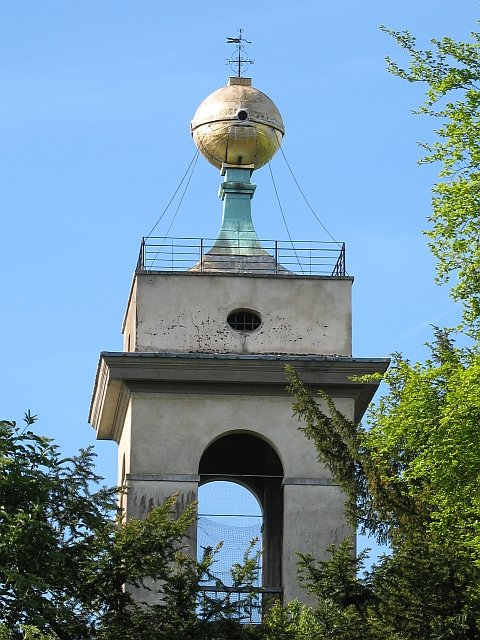
The golden ball on top of the church tower at West Wycombe, with a south-facing porthole

It is not known why Norris built the tower, although a number of theories have been advanced, including that it was a watchtower guarding against highwaymen on the nearby road; that it was a beacon guiding travellers on the heath to safety; that it was a viewing platform for watching the local foxhunt; that it was a signalling tower; or that it was simply a folly with no purpose.

The most widely held theory is that the tower was used by Norris for signalling to his good friend, Sir Francis Dashwood (1708–1781), who lived in West Wycombe, Buckinghamshire, close to Norris' second home at Hughenden Manor. In 1751 Dashwood had built a hollow wooden ball covered with gold leaf, 8 feet (2.4 m) in diameter, with wooden seats for several people inside, on top of the tower of St Lawrence's Church at West Wycombe. The church tower was 21 miles (34 km) north of Norris' tower, and it is claimed that the two men signalled to each other from the top of the two towers, either using flags or heliographs (which make signals by reflecting sunlight). Some sources suggest that Norris' tower originally had a golden ball on top of it, matching the one on the West Wycombe church tower, but this is not shown in early pictures of the tower.

Various reasons have been put forward to explain why Dashwood and Norris needed to signal information between themselves. It has been speculated that the two men signalled bets to each other, or that the signalling was related to the activities of the disreputable Hellfire Club that both men were members of. It has even been suggested that they were involved in an espionage network, and that during the period of the American War of Independence Norris passed secret information to Dashwood, who was Postmaster General from 1765 to 1781. This theory is supported by a letter written by Norris, dated 3 June 1778, in which he notes: "Did this day heliograph intelligence from Dr Franklin in Paris to Wycombe".
