= St Lawrence's Church, West Wycombe =

St Lawrence Church, West Wycombe
- The Church of St Lawrence, West Wycombe
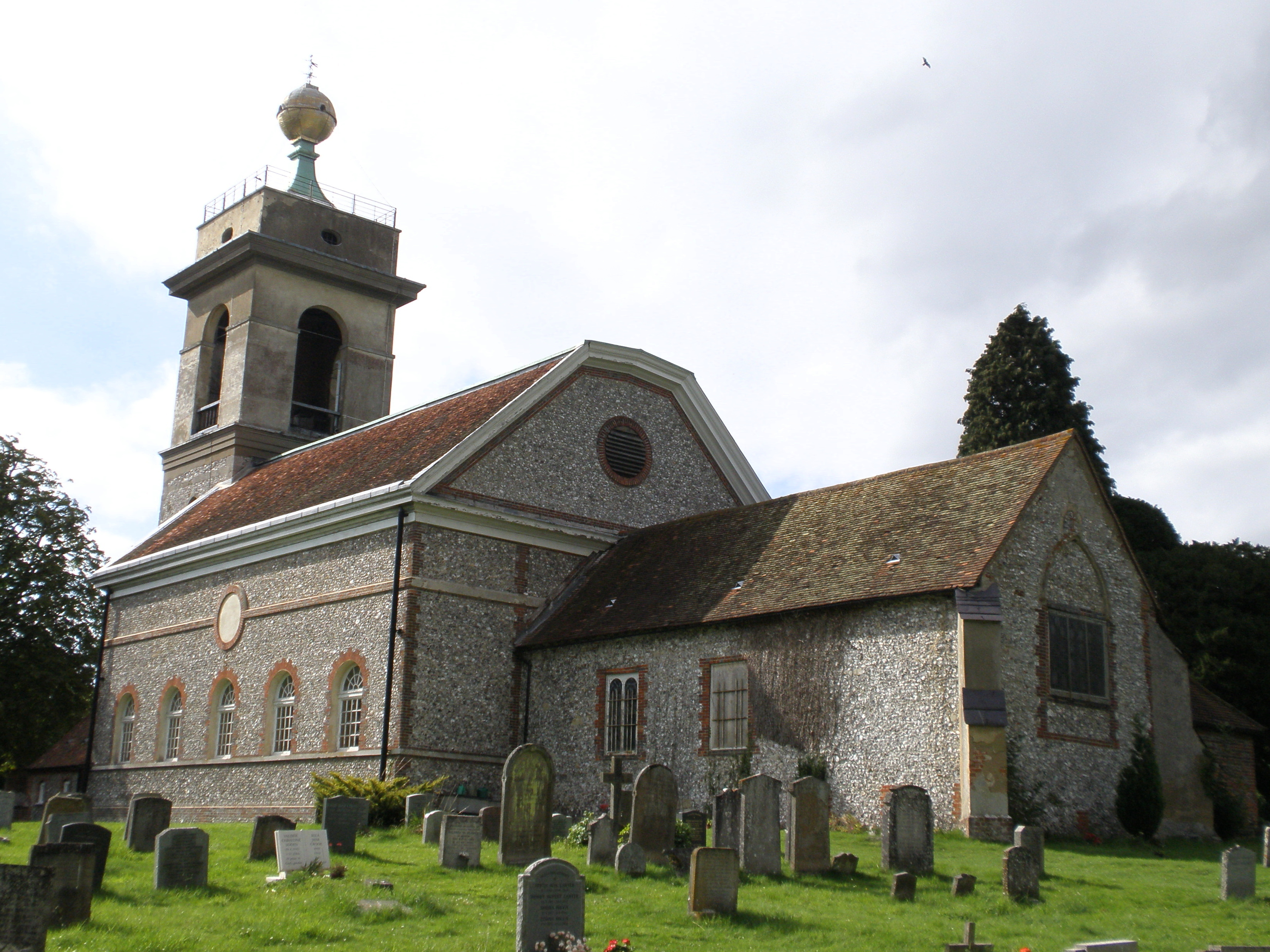
- The church in 2009
- St Lawrence Church, West Wycombe
- 51.647154°N 0.805624°W
- OS grid reference: SU 82737 94963
- Location: West Wycombe
- Country: England
- Denomination: Church of England

History
- Dedication: St Lawrence

Architecture
- Heritage designation: Grade I listed church
- Designated: 9 January 1954
- Architect: Widely believed John Donowell
- Architectural type: Mixed, medieval and neoclassical
- Style: Classical and Rococo
- Completed: 3 July 1763

Specifications
- Materials: Flint, stone, masonry, marble, painted frescoes, gilt

Administration
- Diocese: Diocese of Oxford
- Deanery: Wycombe Deanery
- Parish: West Wycombe Parish

St Lawrence Church is a Church of England church in the parish of West Wycombe, Buckinghamshire, England. It sits on top of West Wycombe Hill in a prominent position overlooking the West Wycombe Road, and surrounding villages. West Wycombe Hill is managed by the National Trust, although the church and graveyard are owned by the Church of England. The church resides in the Chilterns Area of Outstanding Natural Beauty. St Lawrence Church and the mausoleum both occupy similar positions on top of West Wycombe Hill, and the Church tower is visible for many miles around. The top of the tower is the highest point in the Southern Chilterns and on a clear day, it is possible to see West London.

== History ==
The medieval church served the lost medieval village of Haveringdon, and of this building, the 14th-century chancel and tower remain, though heavily remodeled. The Grade I listed church was gradually rebuilt in its current form by Sir Francis Dashwood, 1st Baronet and Baron Le Despenser. In the 1750s the medieval west tower was raised to make it an eye-catcher from West Wycombe Estate, West Wycombe House, and also from the West Wycombe road as one exits towards the West. It was topped by a great golden ball, possibly inspired by the Dogana, Venice. The ball was reputed to be a meeting place for the Hellfire Club – it could seat 10, and was described by the author John Wilkes as “the best globe tavern I was ever in.” It has been suggested that Sir Francis Dashwood used a heliograph to signal through a porthole in the golden ball to his friend, John Norris (1721–1786), who had erected a tower, now known as the Camberley Obelisk, near his home at Hawley, Hampshire, 21 miles to the south. Between 1761 and 1763 the nave was rebuilt and the medieval chancel was remodeled.

The nave as remodeled by Dashwood has the appearance of a “very superb Egyptian hall” in a Vitruvian sense and is derived from Robert Wood’s prints of the ancient Temple of the Sun, Palmyra. It has five bays five and is lined with engaged Corinthian columns under a continuous entablature, the pillars decorated to emulate porphrey. The design of the Trompe-l'œil ceiling in the nave is taken directly from one of Wood's engravings. There is more Trompe-l'œil painting on the walls of the remodeled medieval chancel and in the center of the chancel ceiling is a painting of the Last Supper after Rembrandt. All the painting is by Giovanni Borgnis. Throughout there is spectacular Rococo plasterwork and Dashwood provided fine new woodwork for the church, including Mahogany stalls for the clergy.

The architect of all this work is likely to have been John Donowell who was working for Sir Francis Dashwood at West Wycombe Park.

== Bells ==
There are eight bells in the tower: the treble and second by Mears & Stainbank, 1923; the third by Lester and Pack, 1756; the fourth by Henry Knight, 1621; the fifth by Joseph Carter, 1581; the sixth by Henry Knight, 1620; the seventh by Lester and Pack, 1762; and the tenor by Thomas Mears, 1828.

The bells ringing at St Lawrence Church
Remembrance Sunday 2012

== Golden ball ==
The golden ball can be seen for miles around and is a recognised symbol of West Wycombe village. It is made from a wooden frame covered in gold leaf, 8 feet in diameter, and contains seating for up to six people. There were rumours that the Hellfire Club, founded by Sir Francis Dashwood (1708–1781), met inside the golden ball, but there is no evidence for that. It is no longer possible for the public to enter the ball.

== Churchyard ==
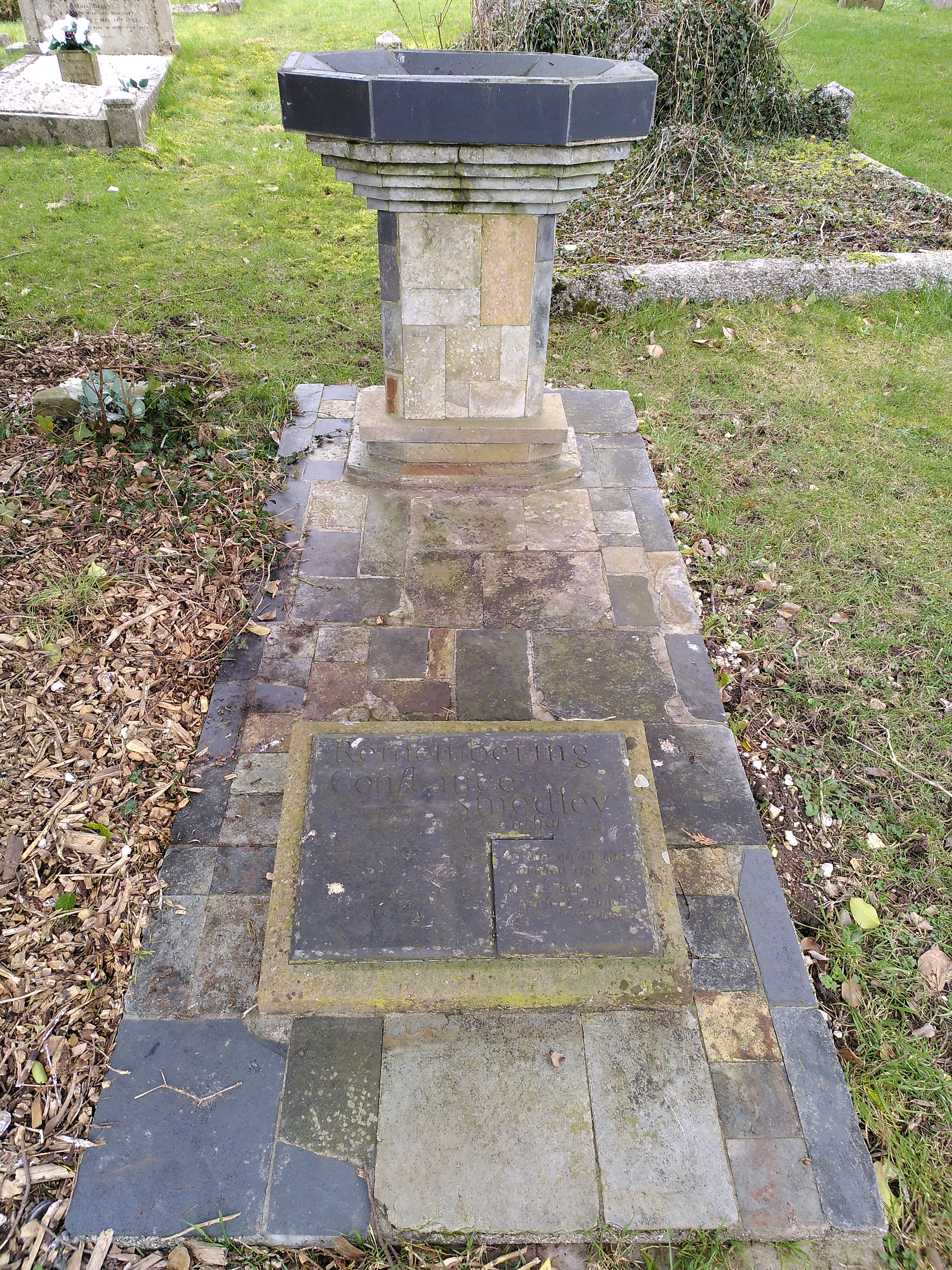
The grave of Constance Smedley

The churchyard contains eleven Commonwealth war graves, six from World War I and five from World War II.

Also interred there is the artist and playwright Constance Smedley (died 1941).

== Popular culture ==
St Lawrence Church has been used as a backdrop and as part of important scenery elements in various popular TV shows and films such as Downton Abbey and major blockbusters. St Lawrence Church can be seen in the film Bridget Jones's Baby, which came out in the UK in 2016. It forms part of the opening scene in the 23 March trailer release.

It is also featured throughout the music video by Paloma Faith for her song "Picking Up the Pieces".

The church also features in series 4 of "Bridgerton"
