= The Spy =

The Spy may refer to:

== Film and television ==
- The Spy (1914 film), a 1914 American film directed by Otis Turner
- The Spy (1917 American film), a 1917 film released shortly after the United States entered World War I
- The Spy (1917 German film), directed by Karl Heiland and starring Conrad Veidt
- The Spy (1931 film), a 1931 film directed by Berthold Viertel
- The Spy (1964 film), a 1964 Egyptian film with Rufino Inglés
- The Spy, a 1999 South Korean film directed by Jang Jin
- The Spy (2012 South Korean film), a 2012 South Korean film directed by Woo Min-ho
- The Spy (2012 Russian film), a 2012 Russian dieselpunk spy film
- The Spy: Undercover Operation, a 2013 South Korean film directed by Lee Seung-joon
- The Spy (miniseries), a 2019 miniseries based on the life of Israel's top Mossad spy Eli Cohen

== Literature ==
- The Spy (Cooper novel), an 1821 novel by James Fenimore Cooper
- The Life of a Useless Man also known as The Spy: The Story of a Superfluous Man, a 1908 novel by Maxim Gorky
- The Spy, a 1920 novel by Upton Sinclair
- The Spy (Cussler novel), a 2010 novel by Clive Cussler and Justin Scott
- The Spy, a 2016 novel by Paulo Coelho
- The Spy (periodical), periodical by James Hogg, 1810-1811

== Other uses ==
- The Spy (Team Fortress 2), a playable class in the video game Team Fortress 2
- "The Spy" (The Doors song), 1970

== See also ==
- Spy (disambiguation)
