= Spiess =

Spiess (spelt as Spieß in German or Spiesz in Hungarian), may refer to:

== People with the surname ==
- Adolf Spieß, German gymnast and educator
- August von Spiess, Romanian officer, writer and hunter
- Christian Heinrich Spiess, German romance writer
- Fred Spiess, American oceanographer
- Fritz Spiess, Canadian cinematographer
- Gerry Spiess, American sailor
- Gertrud Spiess (1914–1995), Swiss politician
- Gesine Spieß (1945–2016), German feminist academic
- Johannes Spieß (1888–1972), German U-boat commander during World War I
- Joseph Spiess (engineer) (1838–1917), built France's only rigid airship
- Mary Lou Spiess (1931–1992), American disability rights advocate and disabled fashion pioneer
- Robert Spieß, tennis player

== Military ==
- Spieß (Hauptfeldwebel), German military slang name (literally "spear") for the Company sergeant major in the German Wehrmacht until 1945
- Spieß (Hauptfeldwebel), the Company sergeant major in the GDR National People's Army until 1990
- Spieß (Kompaniefeldwebel), informal name for the Company sergeant major in the German Bundeswehr
- Spieß, (Dienstfuehrender Unteroffizier) the Company sergeant major in Austrian Bundesheer

== See also ==
- Spiess Tuning, the common name of Siegfried Spiess Motorenbau GmbH, a German engine tuning company.
- Spies (disambiguation) (ending in one "S")
