= Spy (ship) =

Several vessels have been named Spy:

- After the Royal Navy sold HMS Spy (1756) in 1773, between 1773 and 1780 she became the transport Spy.
- Aggie (1777 ship) was launched in Liverpool in 1777. She traded locally until 1781 when her owners renamed her Spy and placed her in the slave trade. The French Navy captured her in 1782 in the West Indies as she was arriving to deliver her cargo of enslaved people.
- Spy (1781 ship) was built in France in 1780, almost surely under another name, and taken in prize. The British East India Company (EIC) purchased her in 1781 and used her for almost two years as a fast packet vessel and cruiser based in St Helena. It then sold her and she became a London-based slave ship, making two voyages carrying enslaved people in the triangular trade, in the Middle Passage from West Africa to the West Indies. next, she became a whaler, making seven whaling voyages between 1786 and 1795. She was probably wrecked in August 1795 on a voyage as a government transport.
- Robert (1793 ship) was a 16-gun French privateer corvette launched at Nantes. The British captured her in 1793 and named her HMS Espion. The French recaptured her in 1794 and took her into service as Espion. The British recaptured her in 1795, but there being another Espion in service by then, the British renamed their capture HMS Spy. She served under that name until the Navy sold her in 1801. Spy then became a slave ship, a merchantman to South America, and privateer again. The French captured her in mid-1805 and sent her into Guadeloupe.

== See also ==
- HMS Spy
