= HMS Carlisle (1693) =

Ship of the line of the Royal Navy

History

England
- Name: HMS Carlisle
- Builder: Snelgrove, Deptford
- Launched: 11 February 1693
- Fate: Wrecked, 1696

General characteristics
- Class & type: 60-gun fourth rate ship of the line
- Tons burthen: 912 bm
- Length: 145 ft (44.2 m) (gundeck)
- Beam: 38 ft (11.6 m)
- Depth of hold: 15 ft 7.5 in (4.8 m)
- Propulsion: Sails
- Sail plan: Full-rigged ship
- Armament: 60 guns of various weights of shot

HMS Carlisle was a 60-gun fourth rate ship of the line of the English Royal Navy, launched at Deptford on 11 February 1693.

Carlisle was wrecked in 1696.
