= John Norris (1721–1786) =

English merchant

John Norris (1721 – 29 June 1786) was an English merchant and a member of the landed gentry. He was High Sheriff of Buckinghamshire in 1775.

== Biography ==
Norris' father, Robert Norris (d. 1751) was a prosperous merchant in London, but through misfortune or mismanagement he lost all his money, and ended up in Fleet Prison (a debtor's prison). Fortunately his wife, Ellen Savage, came from a very wealthy family in Bishop's Tachbrook, Warwickshire, and when her father died she inherited property and lands worth £140,000.

The young Norris was educated at Eton College, and when he was 17 he matriculated at Christ Church, Oxford. He was offered a demyship at Magdalen College, Oxford, from where he gained BA and MA degrees. He later obtained a Doctor of Civil Law.

On his father's death, John Norris inherited land and property in Warwickshire, Hampshire, Buckinghamshire and in Islington. He had two manors, Hawley Place in Hawley, Hampshire and Hughenden Manor in High Wycombe, Buckinghamshire.

Norris had five illegitimate children by his housekeeper, Deborah Busby, three of whom survived: Elizabeth Norris (who married Richard Bevan), John Norris (1774–1845), and Charles Norris (1779‑1858). John inherited his father's lands and properties, and was considered to be the wealthiest commoner in England. Charles was a topographical etcher and writer who is best known for his landscape work of the Welsh countryside, especially the area around Tenby.

Norris left £5,000 in his will to Magdalen College, Oxford, for the completion of the New Buildings, although the buildings were never completed.

== Norris's Obelisk ==
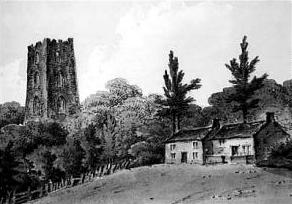
Camberley Obelisk, painted by John Hassell in 1812

John Norris was known as the black sheep of his family, and he had a close friendship with the notorious rake, Sir Francis Dashwood (1708–1781), who lived in West Wycombe, Buckinghamshire, close to Norris' home at Hughenden Manor. Norris was also a member of Dashwood's disreputable Hellfire Club.

In 1751 (or 1761–1763 according to some sources), Dashwood had built a hollow wooden ball covered with gold leaf, 8 feet (2.4 m) in diameter, with wooden seats for several people inside, on top of the tower of St Lawrence's Church at West Wycombe. A little later, around 1765–1770, Norris built a brick tower, now known as the Camberley Obelisk or Norris's Obelisk, on top of a hill 2 miles (3.2 km) east of his house at Hawley. The tower is 21 miles (34 km) due south of West Wycombe church, and some accounts state that it had a golden ball on top of it, matching the one on the West Wycombe church tower, but this is not shown on early pictures of the tower. It has been widely speculated that Norris and Dashwood signalled to each other from the top of the two towers, either using flags or heliographs (which make signals by reflecting sunlight).

Various reasons have been put forward to explain why Dashwood and Norris needed to signal information between themselves. One explanation was that the two men signalled bets to each other, but it has been suggested that they were involved in an espionage network, and that during the period of the American War of Independence Norris passed secret information to Dashwood, who was Postmaster General from 1765 to 1781. This theory is supported by a letter written by Norris, dated 3 June 1778, in which he notes: "Did this day heliograph intelligence from Dr Franklin in Paris to Wycombe".
