= John Norris Hewett =

British artist (c. 1745–1790)

John Norris Hewett (c. 1745 – 22 December 1790; born John Norris Fisher; other married names Gordon and Storr) was a British female art collector and amateur artist.

Her parents were Robert Fisher of Sandyford, Glasgow, a member of the Royal Company of Archers, and his wife Lucy, who was daughter of Admiral John Norris and widow of Sir Gerald Aylmer, 5th Baronet. Her elder half-brother was Sir FitzGerald Aylmer, 6th Baronet. The date and location of her birth are unknown: her age at death in 1790 was given variously as 45 and 47 in contemporary sources; in her childhood her father's residence was Newhall estate in Penicuik. Also unknown is the origin of her unusual forename, though it has been suggested that it was chosen to placate her grandfather Norris, after her mother remarried against his wishes.

John Norris Fisher married three times. In 1764 she married John Gordon of Ballintaggart, Aghaderg, a Captain in the 50th Foot, who divorced her in 1773 for adultery with Captain (later Admiral) John Storr of the Royal Navy, whom she married later the same year, acquiring from him a house in Bedford Square and a life interest in a number of Yorkshire estates. Soon after Storr's death she married John Hewett, né Thornhagh, MP for Nottinghamshire and former High Sheriff of Nottinghamshire. Norris Hewett died at home in Richmond, London. Thanks to an ambiguity in her will, her heirs took up litigation against each another, settling it in 1791.

Two posthumous sales of her art collection were held by Christie's in 1792. Among the works available were pieces by Hubert Robert, John Russell, and Johann Christoph Dietzsch, as well as a large number of pieces by her own hand. These were largely copies, after such painters as Angelika Kauffmann, Joshua Reynolds, Guido Reni, William Peters, and Russell. Their medium is unknown, though it is suspected many may have been pastels. None are known to survive, save potentially one, a copy of The Resurrection of a Pious Family by Peters, which was bequeathed to St. Andrew Warde and turned up at auction in 2015 with no attribution.
