= Jack Norris (footballer) =

Australian rules footballer

Personal information
- Full name: John Thomas Norris
- Born: 20 March 1923; Casterton, Victoria
- Died: 30 April 2015 (aged 92); Nerang, Queensland
- Original team: Army / Casterton
- Height: 180 cm (5 ft 11 in)
- Weight: 71 kg (157 lb)

Playing career^{1}
| Years | Club | Games (Goals) |
| 1946 | North Melbourne | 1 (0) |
- ^{1} Playing statistics correct to the end of 1946.

John Thomas "Jack" Norris (20 March 1923 – 30 April 2015) was an Australian rules footballer who played with North Melbourne in the Victorian Football League (VFL).
