= HMS Spy =

At least three ships of the Royal Navy have been named HMS Spy:

- HMS Spy (1756) was a Bonetta-class sloop launched at Rotherhithe in 1756.
- HMS Spy (1804) was launched at Topsham in 1800 as the mercantile vessel Comet. The Royal Navy purchased and renamed her in 1804.
- HMS Spy (1841) was a brigantine launched at Sheerness in 1841.

== See also ==
- Spy (ship)
