= Spy (gridiron football) =

Defensive player assignment in American football

In gridiron football, a spy is a defensive player assigned to cover the opposing team's quarterback man-to-man.

This strategy is generally used against "dual-threat" quarterbacks who are capable of rushing when passing plays break down. The defensive player floats near the line of scrimmage, following the quarterback's movements.

Generally, spies are linebackers.
