= John Norris (born 1740) =

English Member of Parliament

Member of Parliament for Rye
- In office 20 March 1762 – 1774
- Preceded by: Admiral Sir John Norris

Personal details
- Born: 1740
- Died: 1795 or after
- Spouse: Kitty Fisher
- Parent: Admiral Sir John Norris (father)

John Norris (1740 – 1795 or after), of Hemstead, Kent, was an English Member of Parliament. He was a Member (MP) of the Parliament of Great Britain for Rye, 20 March 1762 to 1774. He was son of Admiral Sir John Norris, a previous Rye MP. His first wife was Kitty Fisher, previously a famous courtesan.
